= List of automotive engineering software =

This is a list of automotive engineering software.

Automotive Engineering Software
Software	Developer	Operating System
Abaqus	Dassault Systèmes	Windows, Linux
Alibre Design	Alibre LLC	Windows
Altair HyperWorks	Altair Engineering	Windows, Linux
Altium Designer	Altium	Windows
ANSA pre-processor	BETA CAE Systems	Windows, Linux
ANSYS	ANSYS, Inc.	Windows, Linux
AutoCAD	Autodesk	Windows, macOS
Autodesk Alias	Autodesk	Windows
Autodesk Inventor	Autodesk	Windows
BricsCAD	Bricsys	Windows, macOS, Linux
CANalyzer	Vector Informatik	Windows
CANape	Vector Informatik	Windows
CANoe	Vector Informatik	Windows
CATIA	Dassault Systèmes	Windows
Cimatron	Cimatron	Windows
Cobalt	Ashlar-Vellum	Windows, macOS
COMSOL Multiphysics	COMSOL AB	Windows, macOS, Linux
DSpace	Lyrasis	Windows, Linux, Solaris, Unix
ecu.test	tracetronic GmbH	Windows, Linux
Fusion 360	Autodesk	Windows, macOS, Web
Graphite	Ashlar-Vellum	Windows, macOS
ICEM Surf	ANSYS	Windows
INCA	ETAS Group	Windows
IRONCAD – Mechanical (add-on)	IronCAD, LLC	Windows
KeyCreator	Kubotek Kosmos	Windows
LabVIEW	National Instruments	Windows, macOS, Linux
Mastercam	CNC Software, LLC	Windows
MATLAB	MathWorks	Windows, macOS, Linux
MSC Nastran	MSC Software	Windows, Linux
Onshape	PTC	Web-based
OpenFOAM	OpenFOAM Foundation	Linux, Windows, macOS, Unix
Pam-Crash	ESI Group	Windows, Linux
Patran	MSC Software	Windows, Linux
Pro/ENGINEER	PTC	Windows
PTC Creo	PTC	Windows
PTC Windchill	PTC	Windows, Linux
SAP ERP	SAP	Windows, macOS, Linux, Web-based
Siemens NX	Siemens	Windows, Linux
Simcenter Amesim	Siemens	Windows
Simcenter STAR-CCM+	Siemens	Windows, Linux
Simulink	MathWorks	Windows, macOS, Linux
SpaceClaim	ANSYS	Windows
Solid Edge	Siemens	Windows
SolidWorks — Power Surfacing (add-on)	Dassault Systèmes	Windows
SRM Engine Suite	Gamma Technologies	Windows
Teamcenter	Siemens	Windows, Linux
TopSolid	Missler Software	Windows

- Proprietary
- Open source

== See also ==
- Ashlar-Vellum – 3D design company with engineering and 3D design components such as Cobalt, Graphite, Xenon, and Argon.
- Automotive industry
- Computer-aided engineering
- Computational fluid dynamics
- Electronic control unit
- Finite-element analysis
- List of automobile manufacturers
- List of auto parts
- List of computational fluid dynamics software
- List of computer-aided engineering software
- List of computer-aided manufacturing software
- List of computer simulation software
- List of 3D modeling software – 3ds Max, Blender, Mudbox, Plasticity, Rhino, SketchUp Artisan, Substance 3D, ZBrush
- List of 3D rendering software
- List of engineering journals and magazines
- List of Python software for automotive engineering – NumPy, Pandas, SciPy, SimPy, Matplotlib, PyDy, OpenCV, OpenMDAO, Scikit-learn, SymPy,TensorFlow, PyTorch
- Product lifecycle
- Vehicle dynamics
