= INCA (software) =

Application software published by ETAS

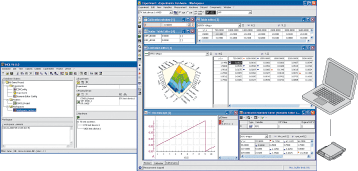
- Developer: ETAS Group
- Stable release: 7.5
- Operating system: Windows Vista, Windows 7, Windows 8 & Windows 8.1, Windows 10, Windows 11
- Available in: English, German, French, Japanese, Chinese
- License: Proprietary
- Website: www.etas.com/inca/

INCA (Integrated Calibration and Application Tool) is a measurement, calibration and diagnostic software published by ETAS. With its large installation base in the auto industry, this development software is deployed during all phases of the development of electronic control units (ECUs) and ECU software programs for measuring, calibration, diagnostics and programming.

== Description ==
Calibrating an ECU software with the aid of INCA enables engineers to adapt the behavior of control and diagnostic functions to a variety of vehicle models and/or model variants, without requiring the modification of calculation routines. As part of this process, characteristic values of function algorithms are entered while simultaneously acquiring signals from ECUs, vehicle data buses and measuring instruments. During the calibration process in INCA, the ECU signals are visualized, which means that any change occurring inside the ECU can be followed up by a detailed examination and analysis of system behavior. This type of characteristics calibration may take place on board the vehicle, in the lab, on test benches or in combination with simulation environments, such as Simulink.

== Feature set ==
A host of functions required for ECU software calibration, such as interface-dependent calibration methods, calibration data management, measurement data visualization and analysis, ECU programming, vehicle bus monitoring, as well as remote control through standard interfaces, are part of the product's functional complement. Available add-ons facilitate the integration of additional functions, such as the symbolic representation of diagnostic data, the calibration of Simulink® models, the integration of LIN and FlexRay buses, plus software calibration and validation by means of rapid prototyping hardware. In combination with suitable hardware products, INCA can access standard ECU interfaces, such as CAN, ETK, Ethernet and FlexRay.

- ECU access via CAN, using the CCP, KWP2000, UDS and XCP protocols.
- ECU access via FlexRay and XCP protocol
- ECU access via Ethernet and XCP protocol
- ECU access via SOME/IP protocol
- ECU access with parallel ETKs via address bus and data bus
- ECU access with serial ETKs, through microcontroller debugging interfaces such as NEXUS, JTAG and AUD
- ECU access via J2534
- Simultaneous access to several ECUs

Former versions of INCA offered interfaces for K-Line and XCP over USB.

== Supported standards ==
- Supports ASAM MCD standards MCD-1b, MCD-2 MC, MCD-2 D(ODX), MDF, MCD-2 Net (Fibex), ASAP3 and MCD-3 MC, AE CDF
- Supports the CANdb for CAN monitoring and transmission of CAN messages
- Recording of measurement data in the file formats MDF3, ASCII, MDF4, DI-ADEM-ATF, FAMOS and MATLAB®-M
- COM-API enable interaction with Windows® PC-based applications
- MATLAB®-API for access to MATLAB® as a control and analysis application
- Exchange of calibration data in physical representation, using the DCM, CVX and CDF2.0 formats
- Supports numerous HEX file formats, e.g., Motorola-S or Intel HEX
