= Infineon AURIX =

Microcontroller family

AURIX (Automotive Realtime Integrated Next Generation Architecture) is a 32-bit Infineon microcontroller family, targeting the automotive industry. It is based on multicore architecture of up to three independent 32-bit TriCore CPUs.

== Applications ==
The AURIX series has been used in some artificial intelligence applications, in electric vehicles, and in the navigation systems of self-driving cars.

== Technical features ==
=== System performance ===
The AURIX family devices range from a 300 MHz three-core device with 8MB embedded Flash down to 130 MHz and 80 MHz single-core and single core lockstep devices with 1.5MB, 1MB and 0.5MB of embedded Flash. The package portfolio includes a BGA-516 package with a ball-compatible BGA-292 package (I/O subset), and compatible QFP-176, QFP-144, QFP‑100 to QFP-64 packages.

=== TriCore DSP functionality ===
- Multicore
- TriCore with up to 300 MHz per core
- 1.7–2.4 DMIPS/MHz
- DSP with up to 1.8 GFLOPS
- Supports floating point and fixed point operations with all cores
- Fast Fourier accelerator
- Pixel Preprocessor
- Embedded EEPROM
- Generic Timer Module (GTM)
- Advanced timer unit for totally flexible PWM generation and hardware input capture
- Redundant flexible 12-bit ADC
- Delta sigma converters
- Single supply 5V or 3.3V
- Availability of AUTOSAR 4.x and 3.2.1
- Ta = -40 °C ... 145 °C

=== Safety Features ===
The AURIX architecture has been developed according to an audited ISO26262-compliant process and designed to meet ASIL-D on an application level. The platform uses up to 2 cores in TriCore lockstep mode, a lockstep architecture combined with safety technology such as internal communication buses or distributed memory protection systems. Hardware level encapsulation techniques allow integration of software with various safety levels (QM to ASIL-D) from different sources, reducing the system complexity of implementing those safety levels.

The AURIX architecture offers the following features:

- Hardware-focused safety concepts for reduced SW overhead
- Lockstep with clock delay
- Access permission system
- Safety management unit
- Safe DMA
- I/O, clock and voltage monitors
- Safety Software for checking the functionality of the core
- ISO 26262 conformance to support safety requirements up to ASIL-D

=== Security Features ===
Infineon has integrated a programmable Hardware Security Module (HSM) into the AURIX family in line with EVITA (E-safety vehicle intrusion protected applications). This “embedded chipcard” protects against IP infringement, fraud and software hijacking.

- Hardware Security Module (HSM)
- Secure software updates, Secure Boot, Secure Key Update, Secure Communication
- Immobilizer
- Tuning protection
- Mileage protection
- Component protection
- IP protection

=== Scalability ===
- From Single Core to Triple Lockstep Core
- 80–300 MHz
- 256KB – 8MB Flash
- 48KB – 2.7MB SRAM
- ASIL Level from QM up to ASIL D
- HOT Package Option

=== Connectivity ===
- Ethernet 100Mbit
- FlexRay
- High-Speed Serial Link IF
- SPI, CAN (FD), LIN, UART
- Hardware SENT interface for low CPU load
- Camera Interface (up to 16-bit)
- External ADC IF (up to 16-bit)
- External Bus Interface for Memory Extension

=== Supply security ===
Infineon has set up dual-fab manufacturing using two local separated Frontend production sites. Both sites are using identical certified processes and tooling. All products from both sides will be AEC-Q100 qualified and are manufactured in a 65 nm technology.Infineon has officially stated that the embedded flash technology for TC39xXX utilizes a 40 nm manufacturing process.

== Tools and software ==
Infineon has several full-featured evaluation boards for their TriCore product line. Development tools for evaluation such as compilers, debuggers and AURIX Development Studio IDE are included, as well as technical documentation: user manuals, architecture manuals, application notes, data sheets, board documentation.
