= CANalyzer =

Analysis software tool

- Developer: Vector Informatik
- Release: 1992; 34 years ago
- Stable release: 19
- Operating system: Windows 11/10/Server 2022
- License: Proprietary
- Website: www.vector.com/canalyzer/

CANalyzer is an analysis software tool from Vector Informatik GmbH. This development software is primarily used by automotive and electronic control unit suppliers to analyze the data traffic in serial bus systems. The most relevant bus systems to CANalyzer are CAN, LIN, FlexRay, Ethernet and MOST, as well as CAN-based protocols such as J1939, CANopen, and ARINC 825.

== History ==
Vector first offered CANalyzer on the market in 1992, and has been continually updating it since then. Today it is a widely used analysis tool for CAN buses. Besides its primary field of application, which is in-vehicle electronic networking in the automotive industry, CANalyzer is also used in many other industries such as rail transportation, heavy-duty vehicles, special-purpose vehicles, avionics, and medical technology. New technologies based on IP architectures in the automotive industry are supported by CANalyzer.

CANalyzer offers bus monitoring, stimulation, and analysis functions for message traffic and data content. It allows users to configure and expand its functionality using an integrated programming language. CANalyzer displays and evaluates data in both raw and symbolic formats, providing a versatile measurement setup.

Back in 1992, Vector had already developed the DBC data format, which has become the de facto standard in the automotive industry for exchanging CAN descriptions. Relevant standards are supported for other bus systems as well, such as FIBEX for FlexRay, LDF for LIN and EDS/DCF/XDD for CANopen.

== Versions ==
CANalyzer version 1.0 was released in 1992. CANalyzer was previously available in three different variants: Professional (PRO), which includes CAPL programming ability, Expert (EXP) which includes panels, and Fundamental (FUN), with basic features. The Fundamental variant has been discontinued as of April 2023.

== See also ==
- CANoe
- CANape
