= CANoe =

Software tool by Vector Informatik

- Developer: Vector Informatik
- Release: 1996
- Stable release: 20
- Operating system: Windows 10/11/Server 2022/2025
- License: Proprietary
- Website: vector.com/canoe/

CANoe is a development and testing software tool from Vector Informatik GmbH. The software is primarily used by automotive manufacturers and electronic control unit (ECU) suppliers for development, analysis, simulation, testing, diagnostics and start-up of ECU networks and individual ECUs. Its widespread use and large number of supported vehicle bus systems makes it especially well suited for ECU development in conventional vehicles, as well as hybrid vehicles and electric vehicles. The simulation and testing facilities in CANoe are performed with CAPL, a programming language.

CANoe supports CAN, LIN, FlexRay, and Ethernet systems as well as CAN-based protocols such as J1939, CANopen, ARINC 825, ISOBUS and many more.

== Description ==
In 1996 the first CANoe license was sold by Vector. Since then, the software has become established worldwide as a tool for ECU development. In addition to its primary use in automotive in-vehicle electronic networking, CANoe is also used in industries such as heavy trucks, rail transportation, special purpose vehicles, avionics, medical technology and many more.

New technologies based on IP architectures in the automotive industry are supported by CANoe. Beyond the scope of communication in a single car, CANoe is used in the development of cooperative systems via V2X.

At the beginning of the development process for an ECU or ECU, CANoe is used to create simulation models that simulate the behavior of the ECUs. Throughout the further course of ECU development, these models serve as a base for analysis, testing and integration of the bus systems and ECUs. Data is displayed and evaluated in either raw or symbolic format. Back in 1992, Vector developed the DBC data format, which has become a de facto standard for exchanging CAN descriptions in the automotive field. Other relevant standards are supported for other bus systems, e.g. FIBEX for FlexRay, LDF for LIN, Fibex for SOME/IP, EDS/DCF/XDD for CANopen.

While CANoe can simulate the whole communication in a vehicle, it also includes a Test Feature Set, for creating automated test sequences. These automated test sequences can be controlled fully automated by usual CI tools (such as Jenkins etc). The Test Feature Set included in CANoe has a long history and is therefore available in variants; creation of test cases can be created in CAPL (Communication Access Programming Language - a C-like programming language), in XML, or in C#. The tests can either be manually programmed or generated automatically by different generators.

CANoe's Ethernet option includes Ethernet Conformance Tests (TC8 test suite). CANoe's LIN option includes LIN Conformance slave tests.

== Versions ==
Version 1.0 was released in 1996. The latest version of CANoe is 19. Program Levels: Different variants of CANoe are available. They differ in functional scope (pro, run, pex), supported bus systems (CAN, FlexRay, etc.) and supported higher protocols (SAE J1939, CANopen, etc.). The product supports the languages English, Chinese, German, and Japanese.

== See also ==
- CANalyzer
- CANape

== Sources ==
- Pfeiffer, Ayre, Keydel: Embedded Networking with CAN and CANopen, RTC Books San Clemente, USA, 2003
- Pfeiffer, Ayre, Keydel: Embedded Networking with CAN and CANopen, RTC Books, Japan, 2006 (jap)
- Toshikatsu Suzuki (Senko Medical), Hiroyoshi Takahashi (VJ): Developing a CANopen system for heart-lung machines, CAN Newsletter, Nuremberg Germany, September 2009
- Patrick E. Lanigan, Priya Narasimhan (ECE Department, Carnegie Mellon University), Thomas E. Fuhrman (GM R&D): Experiences with a CANoe-based Fault Injection Framework for AUTOSAR, https://www.ece.cmu.edu/~planigan/research/lanigan-dsn10.pdf, downloaded September 30, 2010
- Becker, Hübner, Hettich, Constabel, Eisenmann, Luka: Dynamic and Partial FPGA Exploitation, in Proceedings of the IEEE Vol. 95, No. 2, February 2007, http://www.gstitt.ece.ufl.edu/courses/spring09/eel4930_5934/reading/pr.pdf, downloaded September 30, 2010
- Institute of Electrical Engineering, Beijing Fang Li, Lifang Wang and Chenglin Liao: Evaluating the Communication Impact on Quality of Service in Steer-by-wire Systems, IEEE Vehicle Power and Propulsion Conference (VPPC), September 3–5, 2008, Harbin, China, https://web.archive.org/web/20110722014340/http://up.daneshpajooh.ir/pdf/ieee2008/Evaluating-the-Communication-Impact-on-Quality-of-Service-in-Steer-by-wire-Systems_www.daneshpajooh.ir.pdf, downloaded September 30, 2010
- Sandeep Neema, Gabor Karsai (Institute for Software Integrated Systems Vanderbilt University): Embedded Control Systems Language for Distributed Processing (ECSL-DP), http://w3.isis.vanderbilt.edu/Janos/CS388/Reading%20List/Papers/Automotive%20testbed%20report.pdf, downloaded September 30, 2010
- Jürgen Wölfle (Conti Temic): Testing Concepts and Test Environments of a Tier 1 Supplier, Vector Congress, Stuttgart, 2010
