= CANape =

Software tool by Vector Informatik

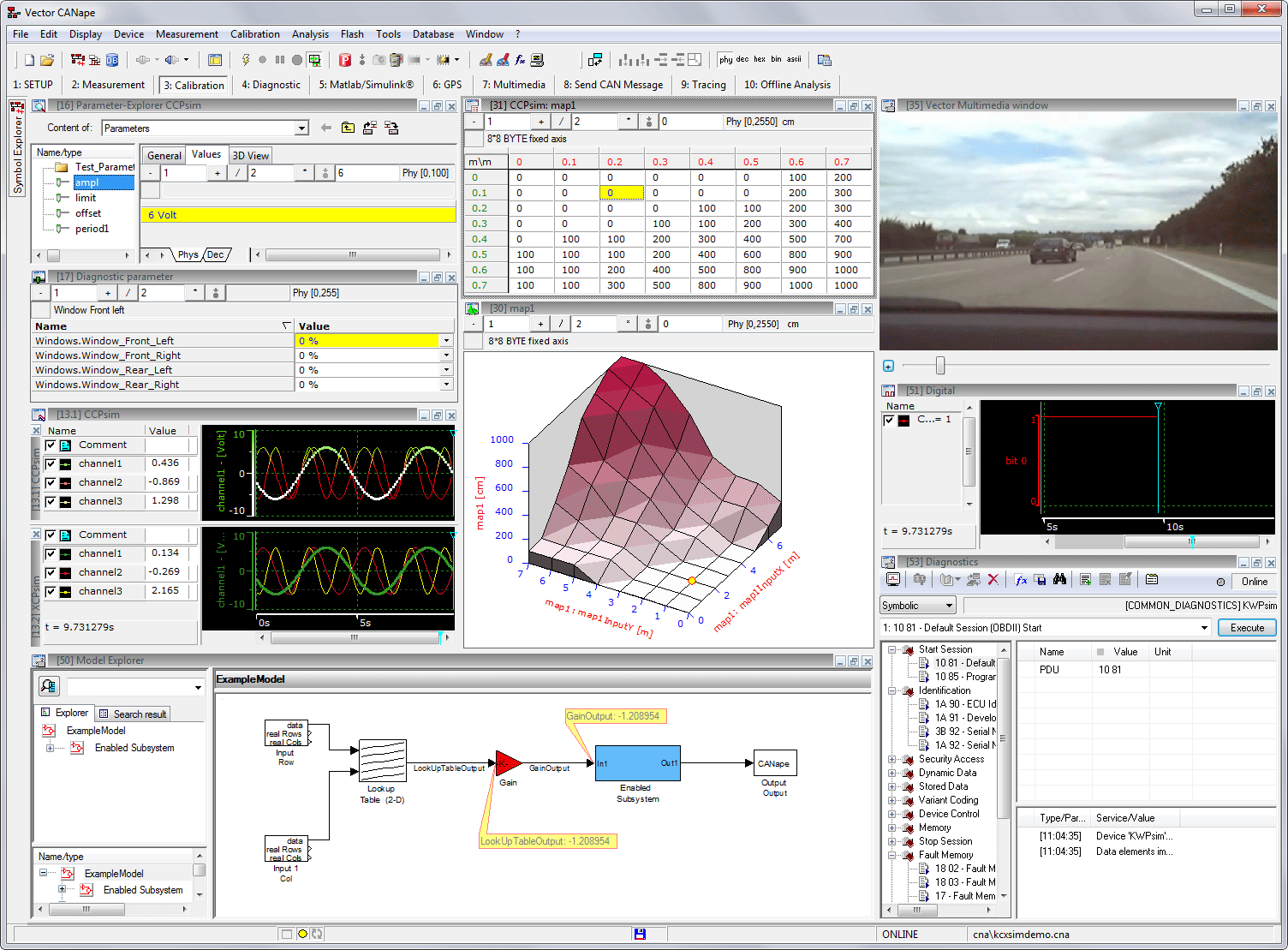
- Screenshot CANape 10.0
- Developer(s): Vector Informatik
- Operating system: Windows Vista, 7, 8, 8.1, 10
- Type: Data Acquisition
- License: Proprietary
- Website: www.vector.com/canape

CANape is a software tool from Vector Informatik. This development software, widely used by OEMs and ECU suppliers of automotive industries is used to calibrate algorithms in ECUs at runtime.

== Description ==
In calibrating ECUs, control behavior is modified for different vehicle models or variants. This is not done by making changes to the program code, but instead by changing the ECU's parameterization. This involves the use of measurement and calibration systems such as CANape in the laboratory, on test benches or in vehicles during test trials. To evaluate the effects of changes to parameters, development engineers access the relevant process variables with conventional measurement technology at sensors and actuators and read out the data from the ECU. Measured data internal to the ECU, e.g. intermediate results of a computational function, can be accessed via ASAM standard protocols XCP or CCP and the ECU's standard interfaces (CAN, FlexRay, LIN, Ethernet/BroadR-Reach). For high-performance ECU access, data from microcontroller-specific interfaces (for example JTAG, DAP, AURORA) can be converted via external hardware (like Vector's VX1000 system) in XCP on Ethernet. A typical use case for calibration with CANape is online calibration. This involves modifying parameters directly in the ECU. The resulting control characteristic can be measured and checked directly. Using this approach, measured data from the ECU or physical measurement variables on or in the vehicle can be precisely analyzed to determine the effects of each individual change.

== Features ==
Functions required to modify parameter values are implemented as standard features in CANape: Measuring, analyzing (manually or automated), calibrating, calibration data management, and flashing. CANape also enables symbolic access to data and functions accessible via the diagnostic protocol, and it supports calibration over XCP on FlexRay.

Options extend the functional features of CANape by enabling access to models at runtime in Simulink, functional bypassing, optical verification of object detection algorithms in developing driver assistance systems (ADAS), and an ASAM MCD3 interface.

CANape uses its own scripting language, hereinafter referred to as CASL (Calculation and Scripting Language). CASL, is a signal-oriented language. CANape contains a function editor for writing cross-device functions and scripts. The CASL scripting language used for this is similar to the C programming language. For easier use, CANape provides an IntelliSense input, code blocks, and various built-in function groups. Functions and scripts can be used to solve a variety of different tasks from simple calculations, e.g., adding signals, to automation of CANape.

== Versions ==
Version 1.0 was released in 1996. Up to Version 6.0 the product was known as CANape Graph. In January 2017, CANape version 15.0 was current. In October 2019, the current version was 17.0.

== Supported standards ==
Internal ECU parameters are accessed via standardized measurement and calibration protocols such as CCP (CAN Calibration Protocol) and XCP (Universal Measurement and Calibration Protocol). CANape was the first measurement and calibration tool to enable access over XCP on CAN and XCP on FlexRay.

Supported ASAM standards, status as of June 2015:

- AE MCD-1 XCP
- XCP on CAN Interface Reference
- XCP on Ethernet Interface Reference
- XCP on FlexRay Interface Reference
- XCP on SxI Interface Reference
- XCP on USB Interface Reference
- AE MCD-1 CCP
- AE MCD-2MC ASAP2/A2L
- AE MCD-2D ODX
- AE MCD-2 FIBEX
- AE MCD-3
- COM/DCOM Interface Reference
- ASAP3 (Automation/Optimization Interface)
- MDF

Other supported standards:

- CAN with DBC description format, CAN FD, Ethernet, BroadR-Reach, SOME/IP, FlexRay, LIN, SAE J1939, GMLAN, and MOST
- KWP2000 on K-Line
- ISO 14230 (KWP2000 on CAN) and ISO 14229 (UDS)
- Transport protocols ISO/TF2 and VW-TP2.0
- Integration of measuring devices and hardware interfaces of third-party manufacturers
- iLinkRT

If a development task requires a high measurement data throughput of up to 30 MB/s, Vector's VX1000 System can be used to access data over microcontroller-specific data trace and debug interfaces like JTAG, DAP, LFAST, RTP/DMM, Nexus AUX or AURORA.

== See also ==
- CANalyzer
- CANoe
