= OSEK =

Specifications for embedded operating systems within automotives

OSEK (Offene Systeme und deren Schnittstellen für die Elektronik in Kraftfahrzeugen; English: "Open Systems and their Interfaces for the Electronics in Motor Vehicles") is a standards body that has produced specifications for an embedded operating system, a communications stack, and a network management protocol for automotive embedded systems. It has produced related specifications, namely AUTOSAR. OSEK was designed to provide a reliable standard software architecture for the various electronic control units (ECUs) throughout a car.

OSEK was founded in 1993 by a German automotive company consortium (BMW, Robert Bosch GmbH, DaimlerChrysler, Opel, Siemens, and Volkswagen Group) and the University of Karlsruhe. In 1994, the French cars manufacturers Renault and PSA Peugeot Citroën, which had a similar project called VDX (Vehicle Distributed eXecutive), joined the consortium. Therefore, the official name was OSEK/VDX and OSEK was registered trademark of Continental Automotive GmbH (until 2007: Siemens).

== Standards ==
OSEK is an open standard, published by a consortium founded by the automobile industry. Some parts of OSEK are standardized in ISO 17356.

- ISO 17356-1:2005 Road vehicles—Open interface for embedded automotive applications—Part 1: General structure and terms, definitions and abbreviated terms
- ISO 17356-2:2005 Road vehicles—Open interface for embedded automotive applications—Part 2: OSEK/VDX specifications for binding OS, COM and NM
- ISO 17356-3:2005 Road vehicles—Open interface for embedded automotive applications—Part 3: OSEK/VDX Operating System (OS)
- ISO 17356-4:2005 Road vehicles—Open interface for embedded automotive applications—Part 4: OSEK/VDX Communication (COM)
- ISO 17356-5:2006 Road vehicles—Open interface for embedded automotive applications—Part 5: OSEK/VDX Network Management (NM)
- ISO 17356-6:2006 Road vehicles—Open interface for embedded automotive applications—Part 6: OSEK/VDX Implementation Language (OIL)

=== before ISO ===
OSEK VDX Portal

- OSEK/VDX Operating system(OS) : "event-triggered" Real-time kernel
- OSEK/VDX Communication(COM) : Application level communication protocol
- OSEK/VDX Newark Management(NM) : Network management
- OSEK/VDX OSEK Implementation Language(OIL) : Offline application description and configuration language
- OSEK/VDX OSEK RTI(ORTI) : Debugging interface
- OSEK/VDX Binding Specification: Binding document
- MODISTARC
  - OSEK/VDX Conformance Testing Methodology
  - OSEK/VDX Operating System Test Plan
  - OSEK/VDX Operating System Test Procedure
  - OSEK/VDX Communication Test Plan
  - OSEK/VDX Communication Test Procedure
  - OSEK/VDX Communication Test Suites
  - OSEK/VDX Network Management Test Plan
  - OSEK/VDX Network Management Test Procedure
  - OSEK/VDX direct Network Management Test Suites
  - OSEK/VDX indirect Network Management Test Suites

== OSEK Functioning ==
The OSEK standard specifies interfaces to multitasking functions—generic I/O and peripheral access—and thus remains architecture dependent. OSEK is expected to run on microcontroller without memory management unit (MMU), which is favored for safety-critical systems such as cars, therefore features of an OSEK implementation will be usually configured at compile-time. The number of application tasks, stacks, mutexes, etc. is statically configured; it is not possible to create more at run time. OSEK recognizes two types of tasks/threads/compliance levels: basic tasks and enhanced tasks. Basic tasks never block; they "run to completion" (coroutine). Enhanced tasks can sleep and block on event objects. The events can be triggered by other tasks (basic and enhanced) or interrupt routines. Only static priorities are allowed for tasks. First In First Out (FIFO) scheduling is used for tasks with equal priority. Deadlocks and priority inversion are prevented by priority ceiling (i.e. no priority inheritance).

The specification uses ISO/ANSI-C-like syntax; however, the implementation language of the system services is not specified. An Application Binary Interface (ABI) is also not specified.

OSEK-OS scheduling can be configured as:

- Preemptive, a task can always be preempted by means of a higher priority task
- Non-preemptive, a task can only be preempted in prefixed compile-time points (cooperative scheduling)
- Mixed mode scheduling
- Groups of tasks (cooperative)

== State of the art ==
=== AUTOSAR ===
Currently the AUTOSAR consortium reuses the OSEK specifications as part of the Classic Platform.

The operating system is a backwards compatible superset of OSEK OS which also covers the functionality of OSEKtime, and the communication module is derived from OSEK COM. OSEKtime specifies a standard for optional time-triggered real-time operating systems. If used, OSEKtime triggered callbacks run with higher priority than OSEK tasks.

=== Research ===
There is also a limited amount of active research, e. g. in the area of systems engineering and OSEK / VDX RTOS or in relation to the compatibility between OSEK and AUTOSAR.

=== Quality ===
In a 48-page report from 2003 by the Software Engineering Institute (SEI) at Carnegie Mellon University (CMU), the specifications were examined and possible weaknesses in the areas of alarm and event mechanisms were identified with possible solutions. The potential of OSEK was also mentioned.

== Implementations ==
Note: A limited number of implementations and vendors exist. Most products are only commercially sold and licensed, others are freely available with open-source license for a limited number of controllers. See also: Comparison of real-time operating systems.

Table of OSEK / AUTOSAR implementations
Vendor	Products	License	Targets	Other information
Elektrobit Automotive GmbH (part of Continental AG)	EB tresos Safety OS; EB tresos AutoCore OS	Proprietary	Infineon AURIX TC38XQ, etc.	Former product names: ProOSEK and ProOSEK/time by 3SOFT (3SOFT was purchased by Elektrobit)
ERIKA Enterprise	ERIKA v2; ERIKA v3	GPL or GPL linking exception or Commercial	ARM Cortex, Intel x86, Infineon AURIX, etc.	Officially certified on ARM Cortex-M4 and Infineon TriCore AURIX
ETAS Group (part of Robert Bosch GmbH)	RTA-OS; RTA-OSEK	Proprietary	Various architectures	
NXP Semiconductors (former Freescale)	AUTOSAR 3.0, 4.0, 4.2, 4.3	Proprietary	PowerPC 5xxx (e. g. e200), S12/S32, etc.	Former product names: OSEKturbo
Siemens (through acquisition of Mentor Graphics's Automotive arm)	Capital VSTAR OS	Proprietary	Various architectures	
Vector Informatik	MICROSAR.OS; MICROSAR Safe	Proprietary	Various architectures	Supporting software: DaVinci Configurator Pro

=== Open-source derivates ===
Note: Open-source developments are often very limited in scope (targets, conformance classes, characteristics) and are not verified against the specifications unless told otherwise.

- ArcCore AUTOSAR OS, by Arctic Core (now part of Vector Informatik)
  - License: Dual GPL/Commercial
- Firmware de la CIAA (former FreeOSEK), specifically Firmware v1
- OSEK, by Chalandi Amine.
- Lego Mindstorms implementations:
  - ev3OSEK
  - nxtOSEK/JSP
- TOPPERS Project (Toyohashi OPen Platform for Embedded Real-time Systems)
  - Release: ATK1
  - Release: ATK2
  - Targets: m68k, sh1, sh2, sh3, h8, arm 4, m32r, MicroBlaze, tms320c54x, xstormy16, mips3, Nios II, v850, rh850
  - License: MIT or TOPPERS License
- Trampoline by IRCCyN.
  - Targets: ARM Cortex, RISC-V, PowerPC, POSIX, AVR, ARM 32bits, MSP430/CPUX, Renesas G4MH
  - License: GPLv2

=== Defunct, not active, unknown status ===
- mKernel for Microchip PIC18F4550 (Former https://sourceforge.net/projects/mkernel/ - not accessible or available as of October 2021)
- openOSEK (no files, hosted on SourceForge, last update: 2013)
- PicOS18 etc. - formerly available and hosted at picos18.com
- Trioztech OSEK was a commercial implementation

== See also ==
- AUTOSAR
- COMASSO association (AUTOSAR BSW consortium)
- Comparison of real-time operating systems
- Controller Area Network (CAN)
- Embedded system
- IEC 61508 is a standard for programmable electronic safety-related systems.
- ISO 26262 Road vehicle safety norm
- Safety standards
