= Andras Kemeny =

French engineer and researcher

- Born: 14 July 1952; Budapest, Hungary
- Education: Docteur d'Etat-ès-Sciences
- Occupations: Engineer and Researcher; Teacher at Arts et Métiers ParisTech; President of the Driving Simulation Association
- Parent: István Kemény et Flóra Szamosvölgyi

Andras Kemeny, born on July 14, 1952, is a French engineer and researcher, and President of the Driving Simulation Association. He is Director of the Laboratory of Immersive Visualization (LIV) ENSAM-Renault from its creation in January 2011 until 2021, Scientific Director of A.V. Simulation, a company specialized in simulation, editor of the Scaner Studio software and common subsidiary of Oktal and Renault companies, from its creation in July 2017 until March 2019. He is now the President of its Scientific Board, and the entry of Dassault Systèmes into the capital of A.V. Simulation has been announced in January 2021, and the entry of UTAC into the capital of A.V. Simulation in 2022. He also is Expert-leader in Immersive Simulation and Virtual Reality for Renault and Associate Professor at Arts et métiers. He is one of the main actors in the virtual reality and driving simulation fields in France and in Europe.

He is one of the pioneers of driving simulation: inventor of the SCANeR driving simulation software in 1990, today marketed by Oktal in co-ownership with Renault, and founder of the Driving Simulation Conference (DSC) in 1995, from which he is the Chairman. One of the goals of this Conference is the rapprochement between industrial and scientific communities in the driving simulation and virtual reality fields.

He created the Technical Center for Simulation at Renault in 2002, renamed Virtual Reality and Immersive Simulation Center in 2013 and today named AD Simulation and Virtual Reality Center.

== Diplomas and career ==
- Doctor ès Sciences (1983) (Paris XII Créteil)
- Associate Research Director of the Laboratory of Physiology and Perception of Action French National Centre for Scientific Research-Collège de France in 2000
- Founder and Head of Immersive Simulation and Virtual Reality Center, Renault in 2002
- Director of the Laboratory of Perception and Motion Control in Virtual Environment, Renault in 2005
- Professor at Arts et Métiers Institute of Technology, from 2007 to 2019
- Director of the Laboratory of Immersive Visualization (LIV), ENSAM-Renault from 2011 to 2021
- President of the Driving Simulation Association, since 2015
- Expert Leader Immersive Simulation & VR, Renault, from 2017 to 2022
- Scientific Director, AV Simulation, in 2017
- President of the Scientific Council, AV Simulation, since 2019
- Elected member of the Board of Directors, ASAM, since 2023

== Select bibliography ==
=== Books ===
- A. Kemeny, J-R. Chardonnet, F. Colombet (2020), Getting Rid of Cybersickness, Ed. Springer
- A. Kemeny (2023), Autonomous Vehicles and Virtual Reality, Ed. Springer

=== Book chapters ===
- A. Kemeny, Prometheus, Cooperative Driving, pp. 196.205, in Advanced Technology for Road Transport, IVHS and ATT, Ed. Ian Catling, Artech House, London, 1993
- A. Kemeny, Industrial use ef Virtual Reality headsets, pp. 195–208, in P. Fuchs, Virtual Reality Headsets, CRC Press, Taylor & Francis, A Balkema Book, 2017

=== Encyclopedic publications ===
- A. Kemeny, G. Allain, Synthèse d'images fixes et animées, Techniques de l'ingénieur, Pris, p5530, pp. 1–21
- P. Fuchs, A. Kemeny, J.P. Papin & G. Reymond, Les Interfaces à simulation de mouvement et l’interface à simulation de climat, pp. 297.315, in Le Traité de la réalité virtuelle, Vol.2: Interfaçage, Immersion et Interaction en environnement virtuel, Paris : Presses des mines, 2006

=== Proceedings ===
Chief Editor Driving Simulation Proceedings: A. Kemeny

- A. Kemeny, F. Mérienne, S. Espié (2010), Trends in Driving Simulation Design and Experiments, Ed. Les Collections de l’INRETS
- S. Espié, A. Kemeny, F. Mérienne (2012), Proceedings of the Driving Simulation Conference Europe 2012, Ed. Les collections de l’INRETS
- S. Espié, A. Kemeny, F. Mérienne (2014), New Developments in Driving Simulation Design and Experiments, Ed. Les Collections de l'IFFSTAR
- H. Bülthoff, A. Kemeny, P. Pretto (2015), Proceedings of DSC 2015 Europe
- A. Kemeny, F. Mérienne, F. Colombet, S. Espié (2016), New Trends in Driving Simulation and Testing, Ed. Les Collections de l'IFSTTAR
- A. Kemeny, F. Colombet, F. Mérienne, S. Espié (2017), New trends in driving simulator design, experiments and testing, Ed. Les Collections de l'IFSTTAR
- A. Kemeny, F. Colombet, F. Mérienne, S. Espié (2018), New trends in Human in the Loop simulation and testing, Driving simulation and VR, Ed. Les Collections de l'IFSTTAR
- A. Kemeny, F. Colombet, J-R. Chardonnet, S. Espié, F. Mérienne (2019), Recent Trends in Immersive Simulation Science and Technology, Ed. Les Collections de l'IFSTTAR
- A. Kemeny, J-R. Chardonnet, F. Colombet (2020), New Trends in Driving Simulation & VR Science and Technology, Ed. Les Collections de l'IFSTTAR, Ed. Les Collections de l'IFSTTAR
