= Fibex =

The ASAM MCD-2 NET standard (called FIBEX for Field Bus Exchange Format) is an XML-based standardised format used for representing the networks used in automobiles. It is being used by the automotive industry for its ease of data exchange.

It has extensibility required for the various network protocols (like FlexRay, MOST, CAN, TTCAN, LIN and Ethernet) used. It is developed by the ASAM consortium.

== See also ==
- AUTOSAR
- XML
