= TMN =

TMN is an abbreviation for:

- Telecommunications Management Network, a network protocol
- MEO (telecommunication company), formerly known as TMN, a Portuguese telecom
- Texas Moratorium Network, an American advocacy organization dealing with the death penalty
- The Morning News (online magazine), an American online magazine
- The Movie Network, former name of Crave, a Canadian television network
- The Music Network, an Australian magazine and charts company
- TM Network, a.k.a. TMN (1990–1994), a Japanese pop band
- TMN Group plc, former name of GlobalData, a British data analytics company
- TrackMania Nations, a computer game
- Tuberomammillary nucleus, a part of the hypothalamus

== See also ==
- Telemetry Network System (TmNS), see bus monitoring
