= OpenDRIVE (specification) =

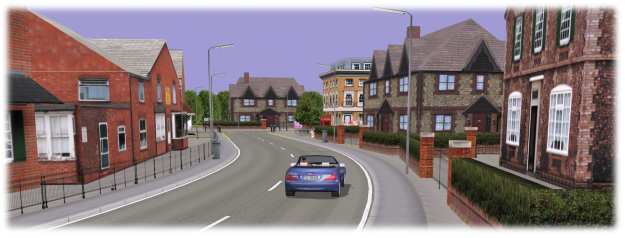
- VIRES Simulation screenshot using OpenDRIVE
- Filename extension: .xodr
- Initial release: 2005
- Latest release: 1.8.0; 22 November 2023; 2 years ago
- Container for: Road network logic description
- Extended from: XML
- Open format?: YES (see )
- Website: www.asam.net/standards/detail/opendrive

ASAM OpenDRIVE is an open format specification to describe a road network's logic. Its objective is to standardize the logical road description between different driving simulators.

The initial release of ASAM OpenDRIVE was version 0.7 in 2005, as of November 2023 the current release is version 1.8.0.

== Overview ==
OpenDRIVE files describe road networks with respect to the data belonging to the road environment. They do not describe the entities acting on or interacting with the road. The OpenDRIVE data is made available to e.g. Vehicle Dynamics and Traffic Simulation via a layer of routines for the evaluation of the information contained in the OpenDRIVE file.

The OpenDRIVE standard is reviewed and released by a team of driving simulation experts. With the publication in 2006 members of BMW Forschung und Technik GmbH, Daimler AG, DLR e.V., Fraunhofer-Institut IVI, Krauss-Maffei Wegmann GmbH & Co. KG, Rheinmetal Defence Electronics GmbH and VIRES Simulationstechnologie GmbH joined the initiative.

OpenCRG, the microscopic brother, is available taking care of the provision and evaluation of road surface descriptions. An implementation of OpenCRG into the OpenDRIVE file format specification has already been established in January 2008.

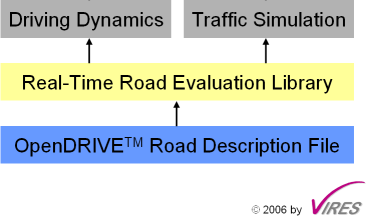

== History ==
=== Founders ===
OpenDRIVE was started in 2005 by Daimler Driving Simulator, Stuttgart and VIRES Simulationstechnologie GmbH. With the publication of the initiative in 2006, other companies joined OpenDRIVE.

=== Core Team ===
The OpenDRIVE standard is reviewed and released by a core team of driving simulation experts. The team members as of January 2010 are (alphabetical order by company):

- Martin Strobl – BMW Forschung und Technik GmbH
- Hans Grezlikowski – Daimler AG, Germany
- Andreas Richter – Deutsches Zentrum für Luft- und Raumfahrt e.V., Germany
- Dr. Günther Nirschl – Fraunhofer-Institut IVI, Germany
- Ekkehard Klärner – Krauss-Maffei Wegmann GmbH & Co. KG, Germany
- Dr. Bernhard Bock – Rheinmetall Electronics GmbH, Germany
- Ingmar Stel – TNO, the Netherlands
- Marius Dupuis – VIRES Simulationstechnologie GmbH, Germany
- Mats Lidström – VTI, Sweden

=== Further Development at ASAM e.V. ===
In September 2018, OpenDRIVE was transferred to ASAM e.V. (Association for Standardization of Automation and Measuring Systems) where it is being further developed under the name of ASAM OpenDRIVE®. With this step, the core team ensured a reliable, independent and long-term development and maintenance of the standard in a professional setting. ASAM is also the organization behind a wide range of other global standards in automotive, among them ASAM OpenCRG®, ASAM OpenSCENARIO®, ASAM OSI® and ASAM OpenLABEL®, which are aiming to advance the validation of autonomous driving functions through simulation.

== Features ==
The OpenDRIVE file format provides the following features:

- XML format, hierarchical structure
- analytical definition of road geometry (plane elements, elevation, crossfall, lane width etc.)
- various types of lanes
- junctions incl. priorities
- logical inter-connection of lanes
- signs and signals incl. dependencies
- signal controllers (e.g. for junctions)
- road surface properties
- road and road-side objects
- user-definable data beads

etc.

== Tools ==
Evaluation of the logics data can be simplified by using a library, which serves as the standard interface between the OpenDRIVE data contained in the XML files and the evaluation of the road data within the application. Tools for OpenDRIVE are available via the website of VIRES Simulationstechnologie GmbH or linked sites of partners include:

=== Real-Time Road Evaluation Library ===
- e.g. OpenDRIVE Real-Time Library

=== Road Designer ===
- e.g. Road Designer ROD

=== Traffic and Scenario Simulation ===
- OpenDRIVE Traffic and Scenario Simulation
- DYNA4

Further tools from different vendors can be found in the product directory of ASAM e.V. Also, Awesome OpenX contains a list of open-source frameworks as well as openly available datasets.

== Version history ==
Project name	Format specification	Schema file	Release date
OpenDRIVE	V 0.7	V 0.7	2005
OpenDRIVE	V 1.1 Rev. D	V 1.1	2007-04-11
OpenDRIVE	V 1.2 Rev. A	V 1.2	2008-01-06
OpenDRIVE	V 1.3 Rev. C	V 1.3	2010-08-07
OpenDRIVE	V 1.4 Rev. H	V 1.4	2015-11-04
OpenDRIVE	V 1.5 Rev. M	V 1.5	2019-02-17
OpenDRIVE	V 1.6	V 1.6	2020-03-12
OpenDRIVE	V 1.7	V 1.7	2021-08-03
OpenDRIVE	V 1.8	V 1.8	2023-11-22

== See also ==
- RoadXML
- OpenCRG – the microscopic brother of OpenDRIVE
