= RoadXML =

- Filename extension: .rnd
- Latest release: 3.0.0
- Type of format: Road Network Description
- Extended from: XML
- Open format?: Yes
- Website: road-xml.org

RoadXML is an open file format for the road networks description used by driving simulators.

== Overview ==
RoadXML was initiated to contribute to road network format standardization in order to enhance the interoperability between simulators. It is the outcome of the compilation of several original formats (GRS, RNS/RS, RND) developed in 1994 by academic and industrial partners: INRETS, Oktal, PSA Peugeot Citroën, Renault, Thales.

RoadXML offers a multi layer description of the environment for fast data access for real time applications. Here are the four main layers of information:

- Topological: element’s location and connections with the rest of the network.
- Logical: element’s signification in a road environment.
- Physical: element’s properties (road surface or obstacles).
- Visual: element’s geometry and 3D representation.

== History ==
Until its 2.0 version, RoadXML was called RND (for Road Network Description):

- The version 1.0 was released in 2007 and used by PSA Peugeot Citroen.
- The version 1.3 was released in 2008 and was an alternative file format for the SCANeR II driving simulator, co developed by Oktal and Renault.
- The version 2.0 was released in 2009 as an open file format and was renamed RoadXML.
- The version 2.1 was released in June 2010.
- The version 2.2 was released in September 2010
- The version 2.3 was released in December 2011
- The version 2.4 was released in July 2013
- The version 2.4.1 was released in July 2016
- The version 2.4.6 was released in April 2019
- The version 3.0.0 was released in March 2020

Since the version 2.1, an open source parser for RoadXML is also available on SourceForge.

== See also ==
- OpenDRIVE (specification), another open format dedicated to the road network description for driving simulators
