= Vector Informatik =

German software company

- Company type: GmbH
- Industry: Software
- Founded: April 1, 1988
- Headquarters: Stuttgart, Germany
- Key people: Managing directors: Dr. Thomas Beck; Dr. Matthias Traub
- Products: CANalyzer, CANoe, CANape, CANdelaStudio, PREEvision
- Revenue: 798,8 million EUR (2021); 1.16 billion EUR (Vector Group worldwide, 2023)
- Number of employees: 4000 (Vector Group worldwide, 2023)
- Website: vector.com

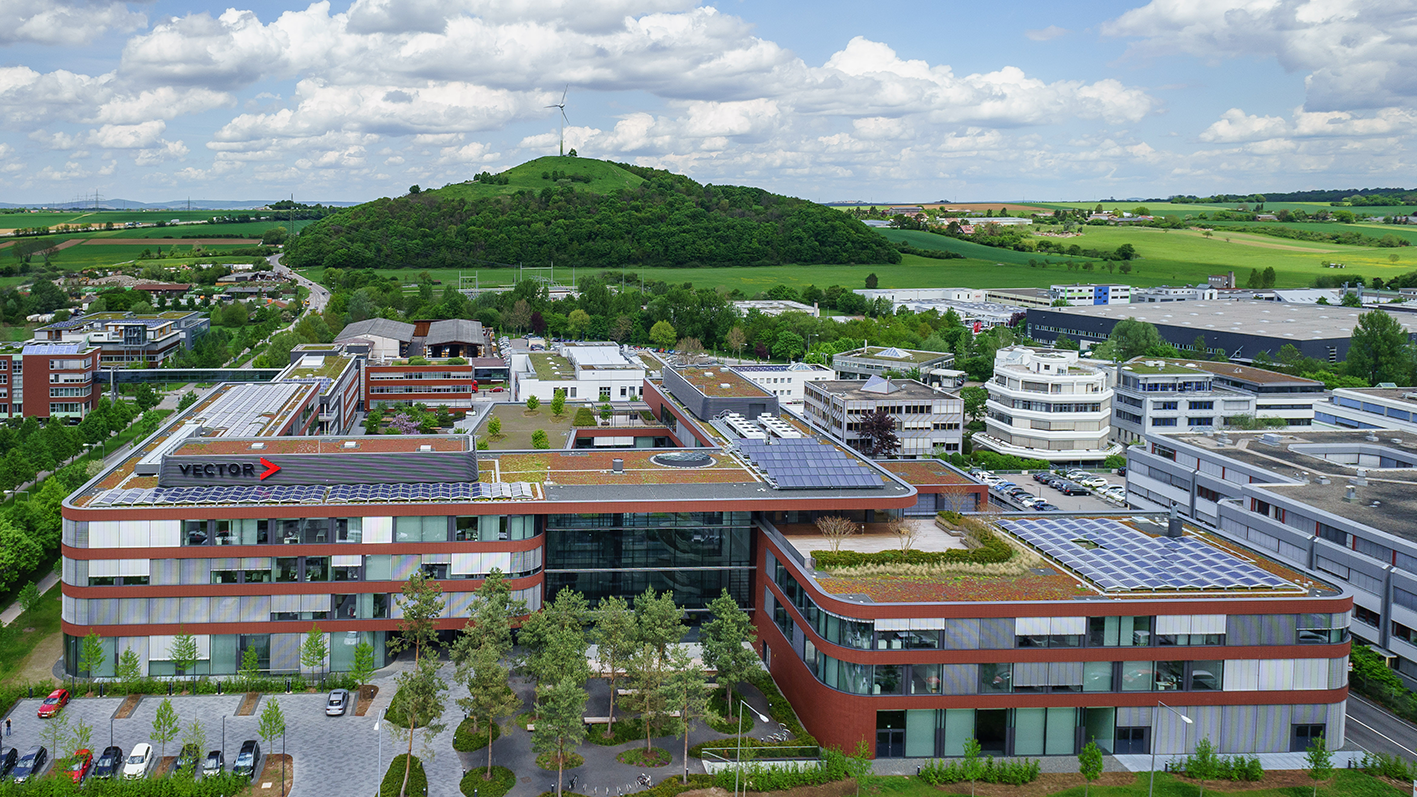
Main building of the headquarters of Vector Informatik GmbH

Vector Informatik develops software tools and components for networking of electronic systems based on the serial bus systems CAN, LIN, FlexRay, MOST, Ethernet, AFDX, ARINC 429, and SAE J1708 as well as on CAN-based protocols such as SAE J1939, SAE J1587, ISO 11783, NMEA 2000, ARINC, CANaerospace, CANopen and more. The headquarters of the company Vector Informatik GmbH is in Stuttgart, Germany. Subsidiaries include Braunschweig, Munich, Hamburg, Regensburg along with international subsidiaries in Brazil, China, France, Italy, England, India, Japan, South Korea, Austria, Sweden, and the USA. Vector Informatik also includes Vector Consulting Services GmbH, a consultation firm specializing in optimization of technical product development. Altogether, these companies are referred to as the Vector Group.

== History ==
Vector Software GmbH was founded on April 1, 1988 by Eberhard Hinderer, Martin Litschel and Helmut Schelling. In the year 1992, the company changed its name to Vector Informatik GmbH. In the same year, the first CANalyzer license was sold and the company attained sales of one million Euros for the first time. In 1996, the first CANoe and CANape licenses were sold.

In 1998, Vector CANtech (USA) was founded, and in the following year Vector Japan. In 2001, the subsidiary Vector Consulting GmbH was founded, which offers consultation services for engineering development and its cost effectiveness. In 2006, Vector Informatik acquired "Division 4m Software" from Micron Electronic Devices AG. In the same year, sales of the Vector Group exceeded the 100 million Euro mark for the first time. In the following year, Vector Korea was founded, and in 2009 Vector Great Britain, Vector Informatik India and Vector China. 2011 the previous representation office in China was converted into a legally independent business. In August 2011 the four owners of Vector Informatik GmbH have transferred their business shares to a family foundation and a non-profit foundation. In September 2011 Vector has welcomed its 1,000th employee. In 2013, a new subsidiary Vector Austria was established, followed 2014 by Vector Brasil and Vector Italy.

In January 2026, it was announced that Vector Informatik had acquired the RocqStat software technology and specialist team from the French company StatInf. The acquisition expanded Vector’s capabilities in timing analysis and worst-case execution time estimation for safety-critical software systems, with plans to integrate the technology into its VectorCAST toolchain.

== Fields of Activity ==
As mentioned above, Vector handles networking of electronic systems based on the serial bus systems CAN, LIN, FlexRay and MOST as well as CAN-based protocols such as SAE J1939 and CANopen. Electronic control modules in vehicles are clearly the company's focus. However, experience gained in this area has also been applied to other areas such as avionics, heavy-duty vehicles, special machines, and embedded systems in general. A selection of press releases provides additional background:

- Diagnostic validation with GM
- AUTOSAR PDUs with FlexRay at AUDI
- Optimizing driver assistance systems at BMW
- XCP-on-FlexRay at Audi
- Efficiency and quality in gear drive calibration at ZF
- Wireless interfacing of development and analysis tools at Bomag AG
- Integrated diagnostic and flash solution for LuK GmbH
- Car2x/DSRC communication

== Products ==
Some of the company’s key products are:

- The CANalyzer analysis tool for CAN, FlexRay, Ethernet, LIN and MOST as well as other CAN-based protocols.
- The CANoe development tool with support for simulation, diagnostics and as a test tool for automotive ECUs. Used at most automotive and truck OEMs and suppliers
- CANape is a development software, widely used by OEMs and ECU suppliers of automotive industries to calibrate algorithms in ECUs at runtime.
- Embedded software components for CAN, FlexRay, LIN, AUTOSAR and others. These components can be found on nearly all automobiles with networked electronics throughout the world.
