= ETAS =

German company

ETAS GmbH
- Type: Subsidiary
- Industry: Automobile, Software, Hardware
- Founded: 1994
- Headquarters: Stuttgart, Germany
- Key people: Mariella Minutolo; Veronika Danner
- Revenue: €356 m (2022)
- Number of employees: 2,300 (2023)
- Parent: Robert Bosch GmbH
- Website: www.etas.com

ETAS GmbH is a German company which designs tools for the development of embedded systems for the automotive industry and other sectors of the embedded industry. ETAS is 100% owned by Robert Bosch GmbH.

== Name ==
The company's name was originally an acronym of Engineering Tools, Application and Services, which has more recently been converted as a backronym to Empowering Tomorrow's Automotive Software.

== Business ==
ETAS GmbH, founded in 1994, is a one hundred percent subsidiary of Robert Bosch GmbH that has international subsidiaries and sales offices in France, the United States, Canada, China, Japan, the United Kingdom, India, Korea, Brazil, Sweden, Italy, and the Russian Federation. ETAS GmbH does not publish its own annual report. The total number of associates amounted to 2,300 as of October 2023.

In 2003, the ETAS Group was formed by the merger of the Bosch subsidiary ETAS GmbH; LiveDevices Ltd., York, United Kingdom; and Vetronix Corporation, Santa Barbara, California, United States. The company's headquarters is located in Stuttgart, Germany. ETAS provides automakers, their suppliers, engineering service providers, and other customers with tools for embedded systems. These include development tools (in the form of both software and hardware) for ECUs used in passenger cars and trucks, as well was engineering services, consulting, training, and support. Such tools have been deployed in the auto industry since the early 1990s to help achieve shorter development cycles, increased software quality, and improved fault analysis.

The ETAS subsidiary ESCRYPT (acquired in August 2012) provides security solutions related to embedded systems.

== Major product lines ==
=== Automotive Middleware ===
- AUTOSAR classic stack
- AUTOSAR adaptive stack
- Deterministic middleware based on Linux or QNX

=== ASCET ===
Open product family for the model-based development of embedded automotive software:

- Model-based software design for control functions and control algorithms
- Office, lab, or vehicle-based simulation and rapid prototyping of Electronic Control Unit (ECU) functions
- Automatic code generation for ECUs in production quality (more than 65 million produced since 1997)
- Compatible with standards such as ASAM (including MSR (Manufacturer and Suppliers Relationship Group), OSEK, AUTOSAR, MISRA, XML, UML and IEC 61508 (certified for safety-critical systems)
- Compatible with tools such as MATLAB/Simulink.

Typical deployment in the development of electronic control units for internal combustion engines, hybrid propulsion systems, transmission control units, chassis management systems (ABS, ESC), as well as convenience electronics

=== ESCRYPT ===
Cybersecurity products for protecting automotive systems, devices and applications:

- CycurFUZZ: smart fuzzer tool for automotive systems
- CycurSoC: embedded cybersecurity software solution for SoC-based automotive ECUs
- CycurGATE: high-performance automotive Ethernet/IP firewall and router
- CycurHSM: HSM security firmware
- CycurIDS: embedded intrusion detection for CAN and Ethernet networks
- CycurLIB: comprehensive cryptographic library for embedded systems
- CycurRISK: software tool for threat analysis and risk assessment

=== INCA ===
INCA is a measuring and calibration environment for ECUs:

- Measuring, displaying, recording and evaluation of ECU data
- Adjustment and administration of data records
- Based on open automotive standards
- Suitable for deployment in the lab, in the vehicle and on the test bench

=== INTECRIO ===
Product family for the virtual prototyping and rapid prototyping of ECU functions:

- Integration of models created in ASCET and MATLAB/Simulink, as well as C-Code
- Verification and validation of ECU functions, also in real-time conditions
- Suited to deployment in office, lab and vehicle

=== LABCAR ===
Product family for the creation of a Hardware-In-The-Loop (HiL) setup. LABCAR is mainly a development application for the hardware interface connection to the ECU: Some execution and automation of ECU tests, based on models created in ASCET and MATLAB/Simulink, is possible to integrate into LABCAR. LABCAR is inseparably connected to Experiment Environment (EE), which usually is the control panel of the HiL currently running.

=== RTA-CAR ===
A comprehensive software platform and toolchain for developing AUTOSAR Classic electronic control units (ECUs). Core Components:

- ISOLAR-A: An authoring tool used for architecture design, system configuration, and managing AUTOSAR XML (ARXML) descriptions.
- ISOLAR-B / RTA-BSW: The Basic Software stack and configuration tool, providing standard modules for communication (CAN, LIN, Ethernet), memory management, security, and diagnostics.
- RTA-RTE: The Runtime Environment (RTE) generator, which acts as the middleware linking application software components to the underlying basic software.
- RTA-OS: A real-time, ISO 26262 functional safety-compliant operating system tailored for resource-constrained automotive microcontrollers.

=== RTA-OS ===
Real-time operating systems (RTOS) for ECU microcontrollers:

- Conformant with standards such as OSEK, AUTOSAR, MISRA, ISO 26262 up to ASIL D
- High performance for OSEK operating systems
- Installed base in the hundreds of millions

=== Hardware ===
Various hardware products serving specialized purposes:

- Connecting ECU processors (e.g., ETK)
- Measurement data acquisition
- Real-time simulation of ECU functions or of physical ECU environments
- Applications for diagnostics and testing for vehicle manufacturers and service shops (e.g., diagnostic scanner for reading a vehicle's fault memory).
