= Franca IDL =

Franca
- Stable release: 0.13.2 / 15 December 2020; 5 years ago
- Written in: Java
- Type: Interface description language framework
- License: Eclipse Public License 1.0
- Website: github.com/franca/franca/
- Repository: github.com/franca/franca

Franca Interface Definition Language (Franca IDL) is a formally defined, text-based interface description language. It is part of the Franca framework, which is a framework for definition and transformation of software interfaces. Franca applies model transformation techniques to interoperate with various interface description languages (e.g., D-Bus Introspection language, Apache Thrift IDL, Fibex Services).

Franca is a powerful framework for definition and transformation of software interfaces. It is used for integrating software components from different suppliers, which are built based on various runtime frameworks, platforms and IPC mechanisms. The core of it is Franca IDL(Interface Definition Language), which is a textual language for specification of APIs.

== History ==
The initial version of Franca was developed by the GENIVI Alliance, now called COVESA (Connected Vehicle Systems Alliance), in 2011 being a common interface description language used for the standardization of an In-Vehicle Infotainment (IVI) platform. The first public version of Franca was released in March 2012 under the Eclipse Public License, version 1.0. In 2013, Franca has been proposed as an official Eclipse foundation project. Franca is mainly developed by the German company Itemis.

== Features ==
Franca IDL provides a range of features for the specification of software interfaces:

- declaration of interface elements: attributes, methods, broadcasts
- major/minor versioning scheme
- specification of the dynamic behaviour of interfaces based on finite-state machines (Protocol State Machines, short: PSM)
- storage of meta-information (e.g., author, description, links) using structured comments
- user-defined data types (i.e., array, enumeration, structure, union, map, type alias)
- inheritance for interfaces, enumerations and structures

== Architecture ==
In addition to the text-based IDL for the specification of interfaces, Franca provides an HTML documentation generator.

=== Implementation variants ===
Currently Franca is implemented in two platforms, which are described in the following subsections.

==== Eclipse implementation ====
Franca is implemented on the Eclipse (software) tool platform. For the definition of the actual Franca IDL, the Xtext framework is used. For the user of Franca, this offers a list of benefits for the activity of reviewing and specifying software interfaces.

==== JetBrains MPS implementation ====
Franca is also implemented on the JetBrains MPS language workbench, which is built on top of the IDEA Platform. This offers benefits of connecting with DSLs built in the JetBrains MPS ecosystem. In addition, Franca for MPS is built on KernelF, which allows better interoperability with KernelF-based DSLs.

== See also ==
- Model transformation
- Automatic programming
- Eclipse (software)
- Eclipse Modeling Framework
- Xtext

== Resources ==
- Klaus Birken. "Franca – Defining and Transforming Interfaces". Archived from the original on 2018-02-12.
