= SRM Engine Suite =

- Developer: CMCL Innovations
- Stable release: 2021.2 / (1 September 2021)
- Operating system: Microsoft Windows
- Type: Engineering Software
- License: Proprietary software
- Website: www.cmclinnovations.com/srm

The SRM Engine Suite is an engineering software tool used for simulating fuels, combustion and exhaust gas emissions in internal combustion engine (IC engine) applications. It is used worldwide by leading IC engine development organisations and fuel companies. The software is developed, maintained and supported by CMCL Innovations, Cambridge, U.K.

== Applications ==
The software has been applied to simulate almost all engine applications and all transportation fuel combinations with many examples published in numerous leading peer-reviewed journals, a brief summary of these articles is presented here.

1. Spark ignition combustion mode: Sub-models to simulate Direct Injection Spark Ignition engines for regular flame propagation events, PM and NOx exhaust gas emissions. Further analysis of knocking and irregular combustion events are facilitated through the implementation of user-defined or the chemical kinetic fuel models included with the tool.
2. CIDI (diesel) combustion mode: Sub-models for direct injection, turbulence and chemical kinetic enable the simulation of diesel combustion and emission analysis. Typical user projects have included combustion, PM and NOx simulation over a load-speed map, virtual engine optimization, comparison with 3D-CFD and injection strategy optimization.
3. Low temperature combustion mode: Known as HCCI or premixed CIDI combustion (PCCI, PPCI), ignition and flame propagation in low temperature combustion mode is more sensitive to fuel chemistry effects. By accounting for user defined or by applying the default chemical kinetic fuel models, users do benefit from enhanced predictive performance. Typical projects include identifying the operating and misfire limits for multiple fuel types.
4. Advanced fuels: To date the model has been applied to conventional diesel, gasoline, blends of gasoline and diesel, bio-fuels, hydrogen, natural gas, and ethanol-blended gasoline fuel applications.
5. Exhaust gas emissions: Through the implementation of detailed chemical kinetic in both the gas and solid particulate phases, all conventional automotive and non-road exhaust gas emissions are simulated in detail.

SRM Engine Suite Data Visualisation

== The model ==
The software is based on the stochastic reactor model (SRM), which is stated in terms of a weighted stochastic particle ensemble. SRM is particular useful in the context of engine modelling as the dynamics of the particle ensemble includes detailed chemical kinetics whilst accounting for inhomogeneity in composition and temperature space arising from on-going fuel injection, heat transfer and turbulence mixing events. Through this coupling, heat release profiles and in particular the associated exhaust gas emissions (Particulates, NOx, Carbon monoxide, Unburned hydrocarbon etc.) can be predicted more accurately than if using the more conventional approaches of standard homogenous and multi-zone reactor methods.

== Coupling with third party software tools ==
The software can be coupled as a plug-in into 1D engine cycle software tools, are capable of simulating the combustion and emissions during closed volume period of the cycle (combustion, TDC and negative valve overlap).

An advanced Application programming interface enables for the model to be coupled with a user-defined codes such as 3D-CFD or control software.

== See also ==
- Chemical kinetics
- Internal combustion engine
- Computational fluid dynamics
- Kinetics
