= Bus monitoring =

Bus monitoring is a term used in flight testing when capturing data from avionics buses and networks in data acquisition telemetry systems.

== Types of monitors ==
Typically a bus monitor must listen-only on the bus and intercept a copy of the messages on the bus. In general a bus monitor never transmits on the monitored bus. Once the bus monitor has intercepted a message, the message is made available to the rest of the data acquisition system for subsequent recording and/or analysis.

There are three classes of bus monitor:

1. Parser bus monitor
2. Snarfer bus monitor
3. Packetizer bus monitor

== Parser bus monitor ==
Parser bus monitoring is also known as coherent monitoring or IRIG-106 Chapter 4 monitoring. Parser bus monitors are suited to applications where the bus is highly active and only a few specific parameters of interest must be extracted.

The parser bus monitor uses protocol tracking to identify and classify messages on the bus. From the identified messages of interest, specific parameters can be extracted from the captured messages. In order to ensure that coherency is achieved whereby all extracted parameters are from the same message instance, the parameters must be triple buffered with stale and skipped indicators. Optionally time tags can be added to each parsed message.

== Snarfer bus monitor ==
Snarfer bus monitoring is also known as FIFO or IRIG-106 Chapter 8 monitoring. Snarfer bus monitors are suited to applications where all messages and traffic on the bus must be captured for processing, analysis, and recording.

A snarfer bus monitor captures all messages on the bus, tags them with a timestamp and content identifiers (for example Command or Status in the case of MIL-STD-1553 buses), and puts them into a FIFO.

== Packetizer bus monitor ==
Packetizer bus monitors are designed for networked data acquisition systems where the acquired data from the avionics buses is captured and re-packetized in Ethernet frames for transmission to an analysis computer or network recorder. The packetizer bus monitor captures selected messages of interest (parsed) or all messages on the bus (snarfed) and packages the message in the payload of a UDP/IP packet. The application layer contains bus identifiers, sequence numbers and timestamps. The most popular application layer protocols used for networked data acquisition systems include the Airbus IENA format and the iNET (integrated Network Enhanced Telemetry) TmNS (Telemetry Network System) format.

== Commonly monitored buses ==
Commonly monitored avionics buses include

- ARINC Standard buses such as ARINC-429, ARINC 573, ARINC 717
- ARINC 629 also known as Multi-transmitter Data Bus
- ARINC 664 also known as Deterministic Ethernet
- ARINC 825 Controller Area Network (CAN)
- Common Airborne Instrumentation Systems (CAIS)
- Cross Channel Data Link (CCDL) / Motor Controller Data Link (MCDL)
- Ethernet
- Fibre Channel
- Firewire, IEEE 1394
- IRIG-106 PCM
- MIL-STD-1553
- RS-232/RS-422/RS-485
- STANAG-3910
- Time-Triggered Protocol (TTP)
