= MOST Bus =

High-speed multimedia network technology used in the automotive industry

MOST (Media Oriented Systems Transport) is a high-speed multimedia network technology for the automotive industry. It can be used for applications inside or outside the car. The serial MOST bus uses a daisy-chain topology or ring topology and synchronous serial communication to transport audio, video, voice and data signals via plastic optical fiber (POF) (MOST25, MOST150) or electrical conductor (MOST50, MOST150) physical layers.

MOST technology had been used in car brands worldwide, including BMW,, Volkswagen, Audi and General Motors.

MOST is a registered trademark of Standard Microsystems Corporation (SMSC), now owned by Microchip Technology.

== Principles of communication ==
The MOST specification defines the physical and the data link layer as well as all seven layers of the OSI model for data communication. For the system developer, MOST is primarily a protocol definition. It provides the user with a standardized application programming interface (API) to access device functionality. The communication functionality is provided by driver software known as MOST Network Services. MOST Network Services include Basic Layer System Services (layers 3, 4, 5) and Application Socket Services (layer 6). They process the MOST protocol between a MOST network interface controller (NIC) and the API.

== MOST networks ==
A MOST network is able to manage up to 64 MOST devices in a ring configuration. Plug-and-play functionality allows MOST devices to be easily attached and removed. MOST networks can also be set up in virtual star network or other topologies. Safety-critical applications use redundant double-ring configurations.

In a MOST network, one device is designated the timing master. Its role is to continuously supply the ring with MOST frames. A preamble is sent at the beginning of the frame transfer. The other devices, known as timing followers, use the preamble for synchronization.

=== MOST25 ===
MOST25 provides a bandwidth of approximately 23 megabaud for streaming (synchronous) as well as package (asynchronous) data transfer over an optical physical layer. It is separated into 60 physical channels. The user can select and configure the channels into groups of four. MOST25 provides services and methods for the allocation (and deallocation) of physical channels.

MOST25 supports up to 15 uncompressed stereo audio channels with CD-quality sound or up to 15 MPEG-1 channels for audio and video transfer, each of which uses four physical channels.

MOST also provides a channel for transferring control information. The system frequency of 44.1 kHz allows a bandwidth of 705.6 kbit/s, enabling 2670 control messages per second to be transferred. Limitations restrict the effective data transfer rate to about 10 kB/s (80 kbit/s). Control messages are used to configure MOST devices and configure synchronous and asynchronous data transfer. Reference data can also be transferred via the control channel.

=== MOST50 ===
MOST50 doubles the bandwidth of a MOST25 system and increases the frame length to 1024 bits. The three established channels (control message channel, streaming data channel, packet data channel) of MOST25 remain the same, but the length of the control channel and the sectioning between the synchronous and asynchronous channels are flexible. Although MOST50 is specified to support both optical and electrical physical layers, the available MOST50 Intelligent Network Interface Controllers (INICs) only support electrical data transfer via a three-copper-conductor configuration, consisting of an unshielded twisted pair (UTP) set and a single additional control line. The additional control line is connected to each MOST50 network device in a parallel single shared bus configuration. Each MOST50 device would contain five copper wire connections in this configuration: Control line (for signals sent from the master) and two UTP sets (each containing D+ D−). One set is used for data input (outputted from the preceding device on the network ring), while the other is used for data output to the next device on the ring. As with its fiber counterparts, closing or completing the ring (termination at the originating device) is required.

=== MOST150 ===
MOST150 was introduced in October 2007. It increases the frame length up to 3072 bits. It includes an Ethernet channel with adjustable bandwidth in addition to the three established channels (control message channel, streaming data channel, packet data channel) of the other grades of MOST. MOST150 also permits isochronous transfer on the synchronous channel.

== Physical layer ==
MOST uses plastic optical fiber (POF) with a core diameter of 1 mm as transmission medium, in combination with light emitting diodes (LEDs) in the red wavelength range as transmitters. MOST25 only uses an optical physical layer. MOST50 and MOST150 support both optical and electrical physical layers.

== MOST Cooperation ==
The MOST Cooperation, a partnership of carmakers, AV equipment designers, system architects, and key component suppliers, was founded in 1998. Their objective was to define and adopt a common multimedia network protocol and application object model.

== Infrastructure ==
The MOST Cooperation has published specifications for the MOST Bus for a number of years. However, these specifications do not include details on the data link layer. In March 2008, SMSC (formerly OASIS SiliconSystems), inventor of the first MOST NIC, and Harman/Becker announced that they would open and license their proprietary data link layer intellectual property to other semiconductor companies on a royalty-bearing basis.

At this time MOST chip solutions are available from SMSC, Analog Devices and some FPGA intellectual property vendors. Development tools are offered by K2L, Ruetz System Solutions, SMSC, Vector Informatik GmbH and Telemotive AG.

== Competing standards ==
- BroadR-Reach has taken a chunk of the automotive communication bus network for Infotainment. First with 100 Mbit/s, then 1 Gbit/s and now 10 Gbit/s for domain controller backbone links.
- The IEEE has standardized single pair Ethernet variants at speeds up to 10 Gbit/s.
- IEEE 1355 has a slice (combination of network medium and speed) TS-FO-02, for polymer optical fiber operating at 200 Mbit/s. The specification is faster than MOST, well tested, and open. However, it lacks industry advocates.
- Ethernet is more standard, higher-speed, equally noise immune, being differential and isolated by transformers. However, Cat 5 cable may be too expensive or heavy for automotive applications. Also, standard Cat 5 plugs do not resist vibration. The thin layers of gold rapidly rub off, and corrosion then causes failure. Standard ruggedized connectors exist, which hold the connectors steady, but are more expensive.
- CAN (Controller Area Network), LIN (Local Interconnect Network) and other automotive OBD standards are not suitable because they are too slow to carry video.
- FlexRay, also an automotive bus standard, though faster than CAN, is intended for timing critical applications such as drive by wire rather than media.
