= Association for Standardisation of Automation and Measuring Systems =

German professional association

Association for Standardization of Automation and Measuring Systems
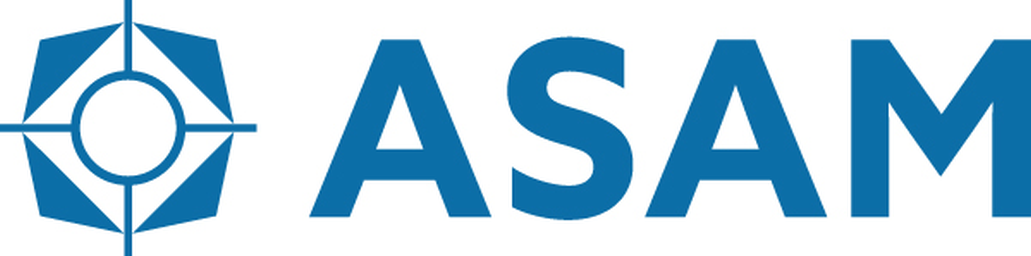
- Abbreviation: ASAM
- Formation: December 1, 1998
- Type: INGO
- Legal status: Association
- Headquarters: Höhenkirchen, Germany
- Region served: Worldwide
- Members: Automotive companies: OEMs, Suppliers, Service Providers, Universities
- Chairman: Armin Rupalla
- CEO: Marius Dupuis
- Website: asam.net

The Association for Standardization of Automation and Measuring Systems (ASAM e.V.) is a registered association under German law. Its members primarily include global vehicle manufacturers, suppliers and engineering service providers from the automotive industry. The association coordinates the development of technical standards created by experts from its member companies working together in dedicated project groups.

ASAM’s objective is to enable seamless integration between tools used throughout the development process chain and to ensure continuous data exchange. ASAM standards define protocols, file formats, and application programming interfaces (APIs) for the development and testing of vehicle hardware and software components. Compliance with ASAM standards is intended to enable interoperability between tools from different manufacturers, allow data exchange without conversion and support the exchange of unambiguous specifications between manufacturers and suppliers.

ASAM standards build on established standards such as UML and XML and are therefore independent of specific IT technologies and platforms. In addition, ASAM works closely with other standardization organizations, including International Organization for Standardization (ISO), SAE International and AUTOSAR.

== History ==
At the end of the 1980s and the beginning of the 1990s, the automotive industry was facing significant cost and efficiency pressures. These challenges also affected the fields of measurement technology and test automation. The tools used in these areas were largely proprietary or highly specialized in-house developments with incompatible interfaces and data formats, which hindered interoperability and data exchange between different tools.

In response, the heads of development at Audi, BMW, Daimler-Benz, Porsche and Volkswagen decided to collaborate and founded the "Arbeitskreis zur Standardisierung von Applikationssystemen" (ASAP) in 1991. From the very beginning, suppliers were included in the standardization process as equal partners alongside the vehicle manufacturers. This ensured that suppliers’ technological expertise was incorporated and that the standards could be implemented in products and services at a reasonable cost.

Standard development was further accelerated in 1996 through the European Union-funded STAUMECS project. As both the number and importance of the standards continued to grow, ASAM e.V. was founded in Stuttgart on December 1, 1998. Since then, the association has been responsible for the legal ownership and representation of the standards, coordinating their development, and promoting their adoption worldwide.

== ASAM membership ==
ASAM has approximately 400 member companies worldwide. While its members primarily come from the automotive industry, ASAM membership is not limited to this sector.

The member companies include:

- End users: OEMs and their suppliers (Tier 1 companies), which primarily use tools and processes based on ASAM standards
- System suppliers: Software vendors and service providers that implement ASAM standards in tools and offer engineering services
- Educational institutions: Universities and research institutes

Members pay an annual fee based on the size of their company. In return, they receive free access to all ASAM products, including standards and tools, and may use them for the development of their own software and as part of their services. Membership also allows companies to propose changes or new developments to standards and to actively participate in their development.

== Business and application areas ==
ASAM standards create a global, OEM-independent market. They enable suppliers to sell products worldwide to end users without the need for extensive customer-specific adaptations, thereby reducing development costs. Companies that actively participate in the development of standards also benefit from a “first-to-market” advantage.

The standards are used primarily in the automotive industry and mainly focus on the definition of interfaces and data formats. ASAM standards reduce development, integration, and maintenance efforts throughout the entire vehicle lifecycle. They are designed for specific use cases and are developed according to the following core principles:

- Independence from hardware platforms and operating systems
- Use of object-oriented modeling
- Definition of both semantics and syntax
- Independence from the physical storage of data

ASAM standards are manufacturer- and technology-independent, making system components from different vendors interchangeable. As a result, investments in tools and processes are protected over the long term.

ASAM uses the following specification methods for the technological definitions within its standards:

- Format description: Defines the syntax and semantics of a file format used for data exchange
- API: Defines interfaces and the functional behavior of executable routines used as callable services and for data exchange between computer programs
- Protocol definition: Defines the syntax, semantics, and synchronization of bus communication in order to establish a connection between two computer systems
- Technology reference: Specifies a technology-dependent interpretation of a technology-independent part of a standard, typically through mapping rules or program code
- Application Area Companion: Defines an extension of a base standard for a specific application area or device type
- Transport layer specification: Defines the implementation of a generic protocol definition on a specific physical layer

== Organizational structure ==
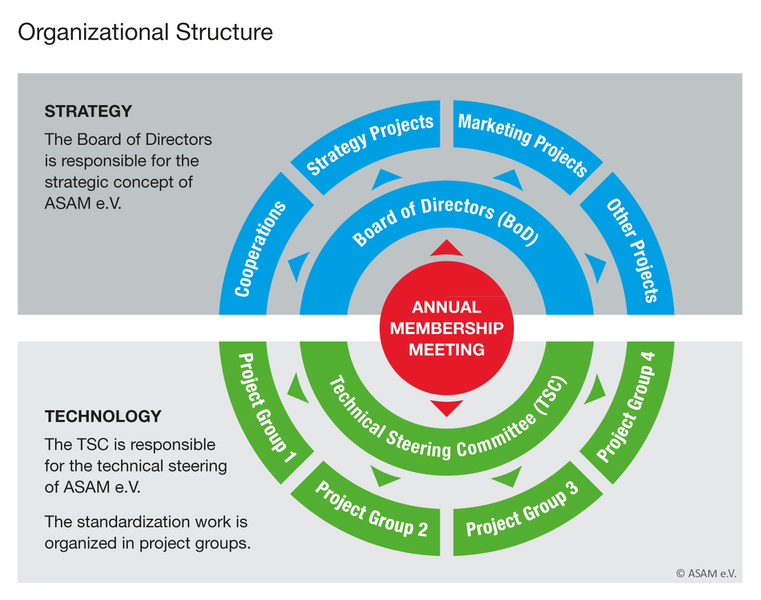
Organizational Structure of ASAM e.V.

ASAM is organized as a registered association under German law. Its organizational structure allows new members to be integrated into the existing organization efficiently.

The highest decision-making body of ASAM is the General Assembly. Each member company holds voting rights proportional to its annual membership fee. Every two years, the delegates elect the Board of Directors and the Technical Steering Committee on an alternating basis. The General Assembly also approves the actions of the Board, adopts amendments to the statutes, and votes on strategically important decisions.

The Board of Directors is responsible for the operational management of the association. It consists of up to five members. The Board represents ASAM in all legal and public matters, oversees the association’s finances, decides on the admission or exclusion of members, establishes policies for other committees, develops the long-term strategy of the association, and monitors its implementation.

The Technical Steering Committee (TSC) primarily addresses the technical and economic aspects of ASAM standards. The committee consists of up to 12 delegates from ASAM member companies. It reviews technical proposals, monitors the progress of project groups, and approves new or revised standards.

The actual development work takes place within ASAM project groups, which are open to all member companies.

ASAM maintains its headquarters in Höhenkirchen-Siegertsbrunn, near Munich, Germany. The ASAM office staff supports the project groups in the development of standards and are responsible for member management, marketing, and international partnerships.

== Standard development process ==
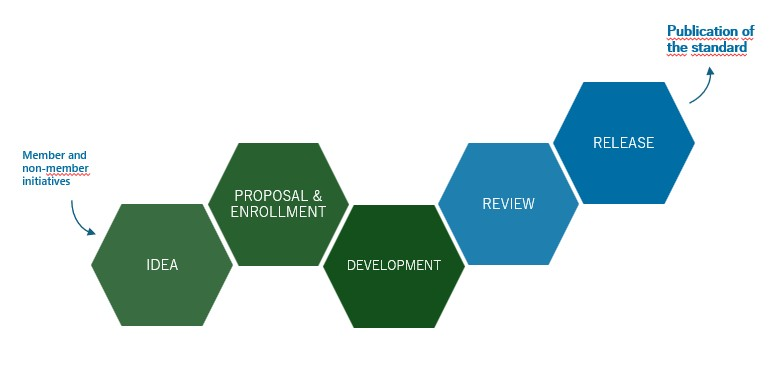
Standard Development Process

The development of new standards and the revision of existing standards are initiated by ASAM members. The process begins with an “Issue Proposal,” which describes the purpose, use cases, technical content, required resources, and project plan. The Issue Proposal is then made available to the other members for review and comments. Afterward, both the proposal and the submitted comments are presented to the Technical Steering Committee (TSC) for evaluation and a decision. If the necessary resources are available and the TSC approves the proposal, the project can be initiated.

ASAM provides the infrastructure required for the project group.

The project team elects a project leader who is responsible for organizing the group’s work, supporting the progress of the project, and ensuring that the group remains within the scope of the approved project.

The ASAM office assigns a Technology Manager (TM) to support the project group. The Technology Manager assists the project leader in carrying out the project. Project groups organize themselves independently according to their individual needs. The project leader regularly reports the project status and progress to the TSC.

To ensure quality, the project results undergo a review process. This review is conducted both within the project group and with the involvement of ASAM members or the general public. This allows users to verify that all requirements have been considered and properly implemented. At the same time, the review process evaluates the consistency and clarity of the deliverables. After incorporating any comments, the project group submits its final results to the TSC for approval. These deliverables may include documents, schemas, reference code, and sample files. Once approved by the TSC and the Board of Directors, the ASAM office publishes the standard.

== Portfolio of standards ==
The standards are divided into the following areas:

- Measurement & Calibration – Standards for working with ECU variables and parameters. These include read and write access to data stored in ECU memory, metadata descriptions of the data, storage of the data in files, and the description of calibration processes.
- Diagnostics – Standards for the description and testing of diagnostic subsystems in devices.
- ECU Networks – Standards for the description and testing of ECU networks.
- Software Development – Standards supporting ECU software development and the development of functional safety features. These include the formal description and documentation of ECU software, the specification of change requests, block sets for model-based development, and representations for visualizing the relationship between safety design and system architecture.
- Test Automation – Standards for working with test systems. These include APIs for programmatic access to sensor and actuator devices, measurement and calibration systems, hardware-in-the-loop (HIL) systems, design of experiments (DoE) systems, and formats for test descriptions.
- Data Management & Analysis – Standards for the storage, retrieval, and analysis of large volumes of data collected during simulation, testing, production, and vehicle operation.
- Simulation – Standards in the field of simulation (also known as the ASAM OpenX® standards) aim to provide a comprehensive set of standards for simulation-based testing of automated driving functions. They support a wide range of virtual development use cases, including hybrid testing approaches that combine virtual and physical components.
