= VeriFlux =

- Written in: Java
- Operating system: Any
- License: Commercial
- Website: www.aicas.com/veriflux.html

VeriFlux is a formal methods based static analysis tool for programs written in Java. It is optimized for use with JamaicaVM, but can be used for any Java program. It can detect uncaught runtime exceptions, including RTSJ exceptions, and possible deadlocks in code using Java synchronization features. It has also been used for resource analysis. It can be used for both full program analysis and partial program analysis.

== See also ==
- Aicas
- JamaicaVM
- Formal methods
- Data-flow analysis
- Real time Java
- Embedded Java
