= SuperTinyKernel RTOS =

Real-time operating system

- Developer: Neutron Code Limited
- Written in: C++, C
- OS family: Real-time operating systems
- Working state: Current
- Source model: Open source
- Initial release: 2022; 4 years ago
- Latest release: 1.08.0 / August 2026; 2 months ago
- Repository: github.com/SuperTinyKernel-RTOS/stk
- Marketing target: Embedded systems
- Available in: English
- Supported platforms: ARM Cortex-M (ARMv6-M through ARMv8.1-M); RISC-V (RV32I, RV32E)
- Kernel type: Real-Time Microkernel
- License: MIT
- Official website: supertinykernel.org

SuperTinyKernel RTOS (STK) is a lightweight, high-performance, deterministic real-time operating system (RTOS) for resource-constrained embedded systems. It is implemented in C++ with a clean object-oriented design and released under the MIT License. Unlike many traditional RTOSes, STK concentrates solely on a preemptive, deterministic thread scheduler rather than providing peripheral abstraction, minimizing kernel size while prioritising timing accuracy and predictability.

STK imposes no dynamic memory allocation, has no dependency on the C++ Standard Library for templates, and provides a fully-featured C interface, making it suitable for safety-critical development. The absence of heap allocation satisfies MISRA C++:2008 Rule 18-4-1. STK avoids aggressive namespace usage, does not rely on modern C++ language features, and aims for a transparent, readable implementation throughout.

== Scheduling ==
STK operates in two fundamental modes. In soft real-time mode, tasks cooperate by voluntarily yielding execution time, with the kernel applying preemptive scheduling to prevent any task from starving others. In hard real-time (HRT) mode, tasks are periodic with guaranteed execution windows and strict deadlines enforced by the kernel; any deadline violation triggers a deterministic failure callback.

Tasks may follow either a static model, in which all tasks are created once at startup, or a dynamic model, in which tasks may be created and exit at runtime.

=== Tick and tickless modes ===
STK supports two timer models for context switching. In the default tick-based mode a hardware timer fires at a fixed frequency and the scheduler is evaluated on every interrupt, providing simple and predictable behaviour suited to systems where timing granularity is fixed and power consumption is not a primary concern.

In tickless mode, kernel suppresses the periodic interrupt and instead programs the hardware timer dynamically so that the next interrupt fires precisely at the nearest upcoming event, such as a task wakeup or deadline. This keeps the CPU in its sleep state for as long as possible, substantially reducing power draw in battery-powered or infrequently active systems while preserving full timing correctness. In STK, tickless mode allows the embedded system to achieve ultra-low power (ULP) scheduling.

=== Scheduling strategies ===
STK supports all major scheduling strategies, including round-robin scheduling (RR), smooth weighted round robin (SWRR), fixed-priority round-robin (FPRR), rate-monotonic scheduling (RM), deadline-monotonic scheduling (DM), and earliest deadline first scheduling (EDF). The EDF implementation selects the runnable task with the smallest remaining deadline and is provably optimal for single-processor systems. Both RM and DM implementations include worst-case response time (WCRT) schedulability analysis. Custom scheduling strategies can be provided by implementing a dedicated C++ interface.

STK also provides two proprietary Mixed criticality scheduling strategies available under a commercial license. The two-level Mixed-Criticality Adaptive Scheduler (MCAS) partitions tasks into low- and high-criticality groups, distributes CPU time between them at a configurable ratio using a token-bucket mechanism, and automatically suspends low-criticality tasks when a high-criticality task overruns its execution budget, resuming normal operation after a configurable cooldown period. The four-level variant (MCAS4) generalises this model to four independent criticality levels with cascade escalation and recovery, and adds an elastic CPU share adaptation mechanism driven by a per-group exponential moving average (EMA), also termed an exponentially weighted moving average (EWMA), execution-pressure estimator, allowing groups under sustained load to borrow CPU share from lower-criticality neighbours without altering worst-case response time guarantees.

== Synchronization ==
STK provides a rich synchronization API comprising mutexes (including a recursive variant and a reader-writer variant with a writer-preference policy to prevent writer starvation), counting semaphores with a direct-handover signalling policy, condition variables, binary event objects supporting manual-reset and auto-reset modes, 32-bit event flag groups allowing tasks to wait on any one or all of a set of flags, critical sections, spinlocks, a thread-safe typed FIFO pipe, and a fixed-capacity message queue suitable for heterogeneous payloads. Custom synchronization objects can be integrated directly with the kernel scheduler. Synchronization support is optional and can be omitted at compile time, causing the compiler to strip all related code and reduce flash and random-access memory (RAM) consumption.

== Memory ==
STK includes a deterministic, fragmentation-free memory allocation module designed for systems where dynamic heap allocation is undesirable or prohibited by coding standards such as MISRA C++. It provides a fixed-size block allocator that manages a pool using an intrusive free-list structure, yielding O(1) allocation and deallocation with a minimal critical section and zero fragmentation over any run duration.

== Thread-local storage ==
STK provides per-task thread-local storage (TLS) through a dedicated CPU register. This allows each task to maintain private state without any locking or dynamic allocation, with no runtime overhead beyond a register read or write.

== Task privilege separation ==
On ARM Cortex-M cores implementing the memory protection unit (MPU) – Cortex-M3 and newer – STK supports hardware-enforced privilege separation between tasks. Trusted driver tasks run in privileged thread mode with full peripheral access, while application or untrusted tasks run in unprivileged mode where any direct peripheral register access triggers a hardware fault. This isolates potentially attacker-controlled code paths, such as tasks that parse network, USB, or firmware-update payloads, from safety-critical hardware state. All kernel services remain accessible to unprivileged tasks.

== Memory protection (MPU) ==
Beyond privilege separation, STK offers optional support for the ARM Cortex-M memory protection unit on cores that implement one, restricting each task's memory access to prevent faults such as stack overflows from corrupting other tasks or the kernel. The MPU can be configured statically, with a fixed set of regions applied once at startup, or dynamically on a per-task basis, with regions reprogrammed automatically at every context switch. Dynamic per-task configuration allows each task to be given private memory regions inaccessible to any other task, achieving full memory isolation between tasks in addition to the privilege separation described above. On TrustZone-enabled cores, MPU support extends across both worlds: the Secure and Non-Secure MPU instances are configured and enforced independently, so an application using TrustZone task separation can additionally apply MPU-based isolation within the Secure world, the Non-Secure world, or both.

== ARM TrustZone support ==
On ARM Cortex-M cores implementing TrustZone for ARMv8-M (Cortex-M23, M33, M35P, M55, M85, and other Armv8-M/Armv8.1-M implementations), STK can schedule tasks across the architecture's Secure and Non-Secure worlds, adding a hardware-enforced isolation boundary on top of the scheduler itself.

STK supports two configurations: a Secure-only mode, in which the kernel and all scheduled tasks reside in the Secure binary, and a Non-Secure + Secure mode, in which the kernel resides in the Secure binary but schedules tasks in both worlds. In the latter mode, Non-Secure tasks may invoke kernel services only through Non-Secure Callable (NSC) gateway functions implemented with Cortex-M Security Extensions (CMSE), so that a defect or compromise in the Non-Secure application cannot affect the kernel or any Secure-side task or memory.

== Multi-core support ==
STK supports multicore embedded microcontrollers through an asymmetric multiprocessing (AMP) model, with one independent kernel instance per physical core. This design eliminates cross-core synchronization overhead inside the kernel, keeps all kernel data structures in the local core's L1 cache, and allows each core to operate with its own scheduling policy and timing domain – for example, one core running hard real-time tasks while another handles soft real-time communication or logging. Cross-core communication is handled via the synchronization primitives described above, which are designed to be safe for use across multiple kernel instances.

== CMSIS-RTOS2 compatibility ==
STK provides a complete CMSIS-RTOS2 compatibility layer that maps the standard ARM CMSIS-RTOS2 C API onto the STK C++ kernel. This allows STK to serve as a drop-in RTOS backend for any project targeting the CMSIS-RTOS2 interface, including code generated by STM32CubeMX, MCUXpresso, and other CMSIS-aware middleware stacks, without modification to application code.

== FreeRTOS compatibility ==
STK provides a complete FreeRTOS compatibility layer that maps the standard FreeRTOS C API onto the STK C++ kernel. This allows STK to serve as a drop-in backend for any project that targets the FreeRTOS interface, enabling migration of existing FreeRTOS codebases to STK with minimal or no application-level changes.

The wrapper covers approximately 99% of the FreeRTOS C API surface across all major API groups – heap and port, kernel control, task management, queues, queue sets, semaphores and mutexes, software timers, event groups, task notifications, thread-local storage, stream buffers, and message buffers. Internally, the wrapper uses STK's fixed-priority round-robin scheduling strategy to replicate FreeRTOS scheduling semantics exactly.

Beyond API compatibility, the wrapper provides a migration path to STK-native capabilities. After integration, the scheduling strategy can be changed to EDF, SWRR, or a mixed-criticality variant by modifying a single template parameter, and hard real-time deadline enforcement, first-class MPU privilege separation, and the x86 development emulator become available without further changes to application code.

== POSIX Threads (pthread) compatibility ==
STK provides a POSIX Threads (pthreads) compatibility layer that exposes a minimal, POSIX-named pthreads-style API on top of the STK kernel. This allows code written against pthreads to run on STK with little or no change. The public interface depends only on the STK C interface and needs no C++ headers, so it can be used from plain C projects, while the implementation calls the STK C++ API directly. The layer is deliberately a subset of POSIX threads, limited to what maps cleanly onto the STK task and synchronization model.

== Hardware support ==
STK targets ARM Cortex-M processors spanning ARMv6-M through ARMv8.1-M (Cortex-M0 through M55) and RISC-V RV32I and RV32E cores, including very small RAM devices using the compact E base ISA. Both soft and hard floating-point are supported. Supported compilers include GCC, Clang/ARMCC 6 and later, IAR EWARM 8.0 and higher. The kernel depends only on CMSIS (for ARM targets) and a minimal surface of the MCU vendor BSP. STK requires only a supported CPU architecture and does not depend on any specific board.

== Development and testing ==
STK includes an full-featured x86 scheduling emulator for Windows, allowing the same application code to be built, debugged using Visual Studio or Eclipse CDT, and unit-tested on a desktop PC without physical hardware, including the ability to mock or simulate peripherals. The scheduler logic carries 100% unit test coverage, and all commits are verified against QEMU targets for each supported architecture. Scheduling activity can be visualised with SEGGER SystemView.

== License ==
SuperTinyKernel RTOS is released under the MIT License, permitting free use in commercial, closed-source, open-source, and academic projects.

== See also ==
- Comparison of real-time operating systems
