= SRP =

SRP may refer to:

== Science and technology ==
- Scaling and root planing, in dentistry
- Signal recognition particle, in cell biology
- Soluble reactive phosphorus, in soil sciences
- Spreading resistance profiling, for measuring semiconductor resistivity

=== Computing ===
- SCSI RDMA Protocol, for transferring commands and data
- Secure Remote Password protocol, for authentication
- Server Routing Protocol, for BlackBerry
- Session Request Protocol, of USB On-The-Go
- Single-responsibility principle, a programming principle (the S in SOLID)
- Spatial Reuse Protocol, a Cisco networking protocol
- Stack Resource Policy, a resource allocation policy
- Stream Reservation Protocol, Ethernet enhancement
- Synchronous reactive programming, a programming paradigm for reactive systems

== Military ==
- Ship-submarine recycling program, a US Navy program
- Soldier Readiness Processing, a US Army program

== Organizations ==
- Salt River Project, a utilities provider in Arizona, US
- Society for Radiological Protection, UK
- Sdruženie rasovo prenasledovaných (Association of Racially Persecuted People), which helped Holocaust survivors in Slovakia
- SRP Records, founded by Carl Sturken and Evan Rogers

=== Politics ===
- Sam Rainsy Party, the main opposition party in Cambodia
- Self-Defense of the Republic of Poland, a political party
- Socialist Labour Party of Croatia (Socijalistička radnička partija Hrvatske)
- Socialist Reich Party (Sozialistische Reichspartei), West Germany, banned in 1952

== Other uses ==
- Suggested retail price
- Stord Airport, Sørstokken (IATA airport code), Norway
- Sports Racing Prototype, a car classification
- Shelf-ready packaging, for a product
- Serpong railway station (coded SRP) in South Tangerang, Indonesia
- Service release premium, payment received by a lender on the sale of a closed mortgage loan
- South Road Properties, Cebu City, Philippines
- Serbian language (ISO 639-3 and ISO 639-2 code: srp)
- Standard Response Protocol
- Sonic Rumble Party, a 2025 video game
