= Phoenix-RTOS =

- Developer: Phoenix Systems
- Platforms: IA-32, ARM, eSi-RISC
- Official website: http://www.phoesys.com/

Phoenix-RTOS is a real-time operating system designed for Internet of Things appliances. The main goal of the system is to facilitate the creation of "Software Defined Solutions".

== History ==
Phoenix-RTOS is the successor to the Phoenix operating system, developed from 1999 to 2001 by Pawel Pisarczyk at the Department of Electronics and Information Technology at Warsaw University of Technology. Phoenix was originally implemented for IA-32 microprocessors and was adapted to the ARM7TDMI processor in 2003, and the PowerPC in 2004. The system is available under the GPL license.

=== Phoenix-RTOS 2.0 ===
The decision to abandon the development of Phoenix and write the Phoenix-RTOS from scratch was taken by its creator in 2004. In 2010, the Phoenix Systems company was established, aiming to commercialize the system.

Phoenix-RTOS 2.0 is based on a monolithic kernel. Initially versions for the IA-32 processor and configurable eSi-RISC were developed. In cooperation with NXP Semiconductors, Phoenix-RTOS 2.0 was also adapted to the Vybrid (ARM Cortex-A5) platform. This version is equipped with PRIME (Phoenix-PRIME) and the G3-PLC (Phoenix-G3) protocol support, used in Smart Grid networks.

Phoenix-RTOS runs applications designed and written for the Unix operating system.

=== Phoenix-RTOS 3.0 ===
Phoenix-RTOS version 3.0 is based on a microkernel. It is geared towards measuring devices with low power consumption. The main problem with the first implementation was low kernel modularity and difficulties with the management process of software development (device drivers, file system drivers). It is an open source operating system (on BSD license), available on GitHub.

=== HaaS modules ===
The Phoenix-RTOS can be equipped with HaaS (Hardware as a Software) modules that allow the implementation of rich devices functionality, e.g. modems. Existing HaaS modules include:

1. Phoenix-PRIME - software implementation of PRIME PLC standard certified in 2014.
2. Phoenix-G3 - a software implementation of the G3-PLC standard.

== Implementations ==
In 2016, Energa-Operator (based in Poland) installed 6.6k Data Concentrator Units with balancing meter functionality in its network, based on the Phoenix-RTOS. License agreements to use the system in the mass production of smart meters have been signed.
