= ESi-RISC =

Configurable CPU architecture

eSi-RISC
- Designer: eSi-RISC
- Bits: 16-bit/32-bit
- Introduced: 2009
- Design: RISC
- Type: Load–store
- Encoding: Intermixed 16 and 32-bit
- Branching: Compare and branch and condition code
- Endianness: Big or little
- Extensions: User-defined instructions

Registers
- 8/16/32 General Purpose, 8/16/32 Vector

eSi-RISC is a configurable CPU architecture. It is available in five implementations: the eSi-1600, eSi-1650, eSi-3200, eSi-3250 and eSi-3264. The eSi-1600 and eSi-1650 feature a 16-bit data-path, while the eSi-32x0s feature 32-bit data-paths, and the eSi-3264 features a mixed 32/64-bit datapath. Each of these processors is licensed as soft IP cores, suitable for integrating into both ASICs and FPGAs.

== Architecture ==
The main features of the eSi-RISC architecture are:

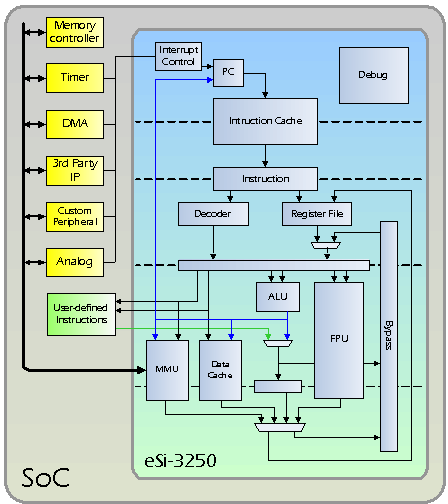
eSi-3250 SoC architecture

- RISC-like load/store architecture.
- Configurable 16-bit, 32-bit or 32/64-bit data-path.
- Instructions are encoded in either 16 or 32-bits.
- 8, 16 or 32 general purpose registers, that are either 16 or 32-bits wide.
- 0, 8, 16 or 32 vector registers, that are either 32 or 64-bits wide.
- Up to 32 external, vectored, nested and prioritizable interrupts.
- Configurable instruction set including support for integer, floating-point and fixed-point arithmetic.
- SIMD operations.
- Optional support for user-defined instructions, such as cryptographic acceleration .
- Optional caches (Configurable size and associativity).
- Optional MMU supporting both memory protection and dynamic address translation.
- AMBA AXI, AHB and APB bus interfaces.
- Memory mapped I/O.
- 5-stage pipeline.
- Hardware JTAG debug.

While there are many different 16 or 32-bit Soft microprocessor IP cores available, eSi-RISC is the only architecture licensed as an IP core that has both 16 and 32-bit implementations.

Unlike in other RISC architectures supporting both 16 and 32-bit instructions, such as ARM/Thumb or MIPS/MIPS-16, 16 and 32-bit instructions in the eSi-RISC architecture can be freely intermixed, rather than having different modes where either all 16-bit instructions or all 32-bit instructions are executed. This improves code density without compromising performance. The 16-bit instructions support two register operands in the lower 16 registers, whereas the 32-bit instructions support three register operands and access to all 32 registers.

eSi-RISC includes support for Multiprocessing. Implementations have included up to seven eSi-3250's on a single chip.

== Toolchain ==
The eSi-RISC toolchain is based on combination of a port of the GNU toolchain and the Eclipse IDE. This includes:

- GCC – C/C++ compiler.
- Binutils – Assembler, linker and binary utilities.
- GDB – Debugger.
- Eclipse – Integrated Development Environment.

The C library is Newlib and the C++ library is Libstdc++. Ported RTOSes include MicroC/OS-II, FreeRTOS, ERIKA Enterprise and Phoenix-RTOS
