= UCOS =

UCOS may refer to:

- MicroC/OS-II, an operating system for microprocessors
- Unsolved Crime and Open case Squad, a fictional department of the Metropolitan Police in the TV series New Tricks
