= Interval scheduling =

Class of problems in computer science

Interval scheduling is a class of problems in computer science, particularly in the area of algorithm design. The problems consider a set of tasks. Each task is represented by an interval describing the time in which it needs to be processed by some machine (or, equivalently, scheduled on some resource). For instance, task A might run from 2:00 to 5:00, task B might run from 4:00 to 10:00 and task C might run from 9:00 to 11:00. A subset of intervals is compatible if no two intervals overlap on the machine/resource. For example, the subset {A,C} is compatible, as is the subset {B}; but neither {A,B} nor {B,C} are compatible subsets, because the corresponding intervals within each subset overlap.

The interval scheduling maximization problem (ISMP) is to find a largest compatible set, i.e., a set of non-overlapping intervals of maximum size. The goal here is to execute as many tasks as possible, that is, to maximize the throughput. It is equivalent to finding a maximum independent set in an interval graph.

A generalization of the problem considers $k>1$ machines/resources. Here the goal is to find $k$ compatible subsets whose union is the largest.

In an upgraded version of the problem, the intervals are partitioned into groups. A subset of intervals is compatible if no two intervals overlap, and moreover, no two intervals belong to the same group (i.e., the subset contains at most a single representative of each group). Each group of intervals corresponds to a single task, and represents several alternative intervals in which it can be executed.

The group interval scheduling decision problem (GISDP) is to decide whether there exists a compatible set in which all groups are represented. The goal here is to execute a single representative task from each group. GISDPk is a restricted version of GISDP in which the number of intervals in each group is at most k.

The group interval scheduling maximization problem (GISMP) is to find a largest compatible set - a set of non-overlapping representatives of maximum size. The goal here is to execute a representative task from as many groups as possible. GISMPk is a restricted version of GISMP in which the number of intervals in each group is at most k. This problem is often called JISPk, where J stands for Job.

GISMP is the most general problem; the other two problems can be seen as special cases of it:

- ISMP is the special case in which each task belongs to its own group (i.e. it is equal to GISMP1).
- GISDP is the problem of deciding whether the maximum exactly equals the number of groups.

All these problems can be generalized by adding a weight for each interval, representing the profit from executing the task in that interval. Then, the goal is to maximize the total weight.

All these problems are special cases of single-machine scheduling, since they assume that all tasks must run on a single processor. Single-machine scheduling is a special case of optimal job scheduling.

== Single-Interval Scheduling Maximization ==
Single-interval scheduling refers to creating an interval schedule in which no intervals overlap.

=== Unweighted ===
Several algorithms, that may look promising at first sight, actually do not find the optimal solution:

- Selecting the intervals that start earliest is not an optimal solution, because if the earliest interval happens to be very long, accepting it would make us reject many other shorter requests.
- Selecting the shortest intervals or selecting intervals with the fewest conflicts is also not optimal.

The following greedy algorithm, called Earliest deadline first scheduling, does find the optimal solution for unweighted single-interval scheduling:

1. Select the interval, x, with the earliest finishing time.
2. Remove x, and all intervals intersecting x, from the set of candidate intervals.
3. Repeat until the set of candidate intervals is empty.

Whenever we select an interval at step 1, we may have to remove many intervals in step 2. However, all these intervals necessarily cross the finishing time of x, and thus they all cross each other. Hence, at most 1 of these intervals can be in the optimal solution. Hence, for every interval in the optimal solution, there is an interval in the greedy solution. This proves that the greedy algorithm indeed finds an optimal solution.

A more formal explanation is given by a Charging argument.

The greedy algorithm can be executed in time O(n log n), where n is the number of tasks, using a preprocessing step in which the tasks are sorted by their finishing times.

=== Weighted ===
Problems involving weighted interval scheduling are equivalent to finding a maximum-weight independent set in an interval graph. Such problems can be solved in polynomial time.

Assuming the vectors are sorted from earliest to latest finish time, the following pseudocode determines the maximum weight of a single-interval schedule in Θ(n) time:

// The vectors are already sorted from earliest to latest finish time.
int v[numOfVectors + 1]; // list of interval vectors
int w[numOfVectors + 1]; // w[j] is the weight for v[j].
int p[numOfVectors + 1]; // p[j] is the # of vectors that end before v[j] begins.
int M[numOfVectors + 1]; 
int finalSchedule[];

// v[0] does not exist, and the first interval vector is assigned to v[1].
w[0] = 0; p[0] = 0; M[0] = 0;

// The following code determines the value of M for each vector.
// The maximum weight of the schedule is equal to M[numOfVectors].
for (int i = 1; i < numOfVectors + 1; i++) {
    M[i] = max(w[i] + M[p[i]], M[i - 1]);
}

// Function to construct the optimal schedule
schedule (j) {
    if (j == 0) { return; }
    else if (w[j] + M[p[j]] >= M[j - 1]){
        prepend(v[j], finalSchedule); // prepends v[j] to schedule.
        schedule(p[j]);
    } else { schedule(j - 1); }
}

==== Example ====
If we have the following 9 vectors sorted by finish time, with the weights above each corresponding interval, we can determine which of these vectors are included in our maximum weight schedule which only contains a subset of the following vectors.

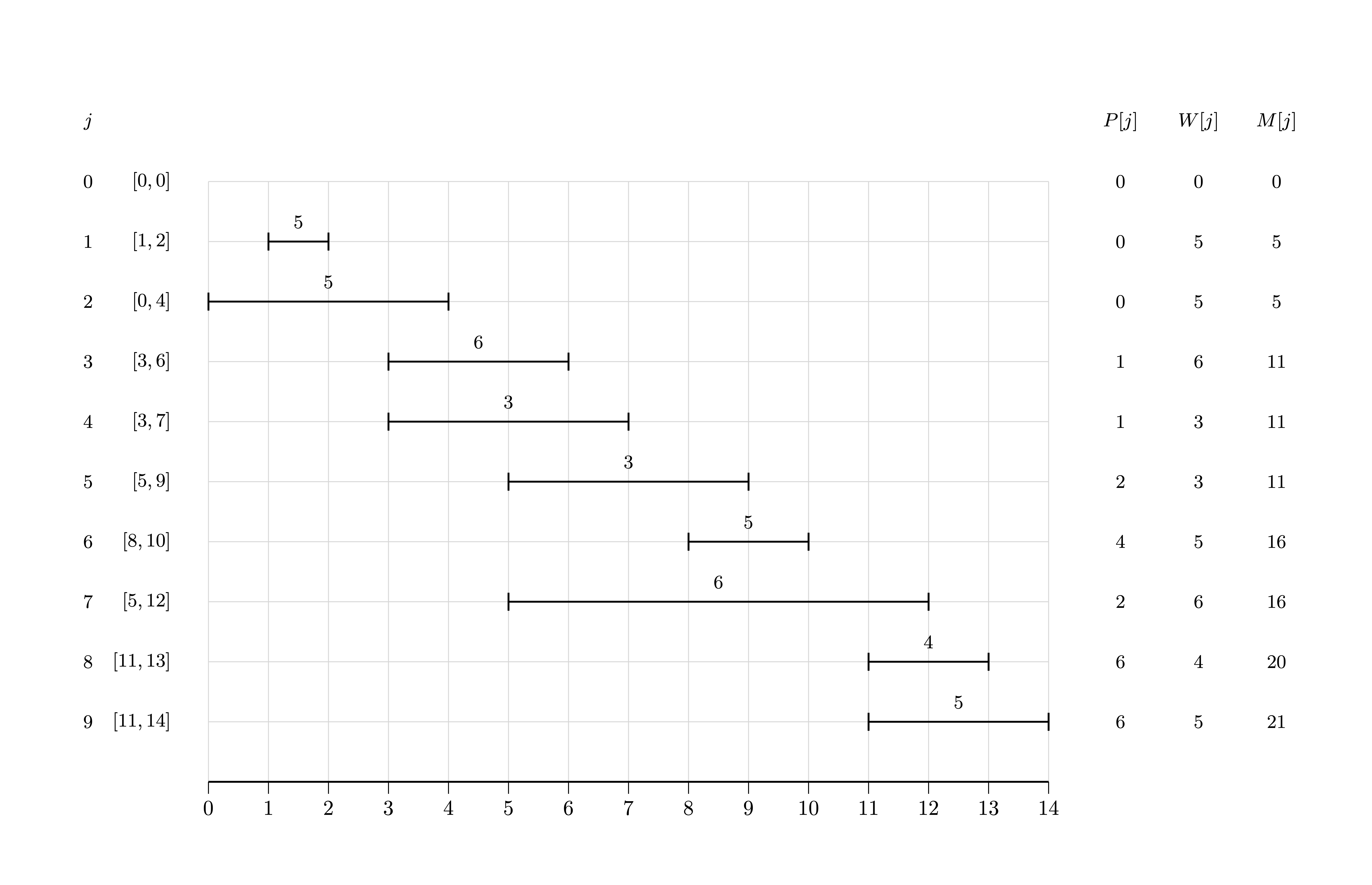

Here, we input our final vector (where j=9 in this example) into our schedule function from the code block above. We perform the actions in the table below until j is set to 0, at which point, we only include into our final schedule the encountered intervals which met the $w[j]+M[p[j]] \ge M[j-1]$ requirement. This final schedule is the schedule with the maximum weight.

j	Calculation	$w[j]+M[p[j]] \ge M[j-1]$ (i.e. This vector is included in the final schedule)	Set j to
9	$$\begin{align} & w[j]+M[p[j]]=w[9]+M[p[9]]=5+M[6]=5+16=21 \\ & M[j-1]=M[9-1]=M[8]=20 \end{align}$$	True	j=p[j]=p[9]=6
6	$$\begin{align} & w[j]+M[p[j]]=w[6]+M[p[6]]=5+M[4]=5+11=16 \\ & M[j-1]=M[6-1]=M[5]=11 \end{align}$$	True	j=p[j]=p[6]=4
4	$$\begin{align} & w[j]+M[p[j]]=w[4]+M[p[4]]=3+M[1]=3+5=8 \\ & M[j-1]=M[4-1]=M[3]=11 \\ \end{align}$$	False	j=j-1=4-1=3
3	$$\begin{align} & w[j]+M[p[j]]=w[3]+M[p[3]]=6+M[1]=6+5=11 \\ & M[j-1]=M[3-1]=M[2]=5 \end{align}$$	True	j=p[j]=p[3]=1
1	$$\begin{align} & w[j]+M[p[j]]=w[1]+M[p[1]]=5+M[0]=5+0=5 \\ & M[j-1]=M[1-1]=M[0]=0 \end{align}$$	True	j=p[j]=p[1]=0

== Group Interval Scheduling Decision ==
=== NP-complete when some groups contain 3 or more intervals ===
GISDPk is NP-complete when $k\geq 3$, even when all intervals have the same length. This can be shown by a reduction from the following version of the Boolean satisfiability problem, which was shown to be NP-complete likewise to the unrestricted version.

Let $X = \{x_1, x_2, \dots, x_p\}$ be a set of Boolean variables. Let $C = \{c_1, c_2, \dots, c_q\}$ be a set of clauses over X such that (1) each clause in C has at most three literals and (2) each variable is restricted to appear once or twice positively and once negatively overall in C. Decide whether there is an assignment to variables of X such that each clause in C has at least one true literal.

Given an instance of this satisfiability problem, construct the following instance of GISDP. All intervals have a length of 3, so it is sufficient to represent each interval by its starting time:

- For every variable $x_i$ (for i=1,...,p), create a group with two intervals: one starting at $50i-10$ (representing the assignment $x_i = \mathrm{false}$) and another starting at $50i+10$ (representing the assignment $x_i = \mathrm{true}$).
- For every clause $c_j$ (for j=1,...,q), create a group with the following intervals:
  - For every variable $x_i$ that appears positively for the first time in C — an interval starting at $50i-12$.
  - For every variable $x_i$ that appears positively for the second time in C — an interval starting at $50i-8$. Note that both these intervals intersect the interval $50i-10$, associated with $x_i = \mathrm{false}$.
  - For every variable $x_i$ that appears negatively - an interval starting at $50i+8$. This interval intersects the interval $50i+10$ associated with $x_i=\text{true}$.

Note that there is no overlap between intervals in groups associated with different clauses. This is ensured since a variable appears at most twice positively and once negatively.

The constructed GISDP has a feasible solution (i.e. a scheduling in which each group is represented), if and only if the given set of boolean clauses has a satisfying assignment. Hence GISDP3 is NP-complete, and so is GISDPk for every $k\geq 3$.

=== Polynomial when all groups contain at most 2 intervals ===
GISDP2 can be solved at polynomial time by the following reduction to the 2-satisfiability problem:

- For every group i create two variables, representing its two intervals: $x_i$ and $y_i$.
- For every group i, create the clauses: $x_i \cup y_i$ and $\neg{x_i} \cup \neg{y_i}$, which represent the assertion that exactly one of these two intervals should be selected.
- For every two intersecting intervals (i.e. $x_i$ and $y_j$) create the clause: $\neg{x_i} \cup \neg{y_j}$, which represent the assertion that at most one of these two intervals should be selected.

This construction contains at most O(n^{2}) clauses (one for each intersection between intervals, plus two for each group). Each clause contains 2 literals. The satisfiability of such formulas can be decided in time linear in the number of clauses (see 2-SAT). Therefore, the GISDP2 can be solved in polynomial time.

== Group Interval Scheduling Maximization ==
=== MaxSNP-complete when some groups contain 2 or more intervals ===
GISMPk is NP-complete even when $k\geq 2$.

Moreover, GISMPk is MaxSNP-complete, i.e., it does not have a PTAS unless P=NP. This can be proved by showing an approximation-preserving reduction from MAX 3-SAT-3 to GISMP2.

=== Polynomial 2-approximation ===
The following greedy algorithm finds a solution that contains at least 1/2 of the optimal number of intervals:

1. Select the interval, x, with the earliest finishing time.
2. Remove x, and all intervals intersecting x, and all intervals in the same group of x, from the set of candidate intervals.
3. Continue until the set of candidate intervals is empty.

A formal explanation is given by a Charging argument.

The approximation factor of 2 is tight. For example, in the following instance of GISMP2:

- Group #1: {[0..2], [4..6]}
- Group #2: {[1..3]}

The greedy algorithm selects only 1 interval [0..2] from group #1, while an optimal scheduling is to select [1..3] from group #2 and then [4..6] from group #1.

A more general approximation algorithm attains a 2-factor approximation for the weighted case.

=== LP-based approximation algorithms ===
Using the technique of Linear programming relaxation, it is possible to approximate the optimal scheduling with slightly better approximation factors. The approximation ratio of the first such algorithm is asymptotically 2 when k is large, but when k=2 the algorithm achieves an approximation ratio of 5/3. The approximation factor for arbitrary k was later improved to 1.582.

== Related problems ==
An interval scheduling problem can be described by an intersection graph, where each vertex is an interval, and there is an edge between two vertices if and only if their intervals overlap. In this representation, the interval scheduling problem is equivalent to finding the maximum independent set in this intersection graph. Finding a maximum independent set is NP-hard in general graphs, but it can be done in polynomial time in the special case of intersection graphs (ISMP).

A group-interval scheduling problem (GISMPk) can be described by a similar interval-intersection graph, with additional edges between each two intervals of the same group, i.e., this is the edge union of an interval graph and a graph consisting of n disjoint cliques of size k.

== Variations ==
An important class of scheduling algorithms is the class of dynamic priority algorithms. When none of the intervals overlap the optimum solution is trivial. The optimum for the non-weighted version can found with the earliest deadline first scheduling. Weighted interval scheduling is a generalization where a value is assigned to each executed task and the goal is to maximize the total value. The solution need not be unique.

The interval scheduling problem is 1-dimensional – only the time dimension is relevant. The Maximum disjoint set problem is a generalization to 2 or more dimensions. This generalization, too, is NP-complete.

Another variation is resource allocation, in which a set of intervals s are scheduled using resources k such that k is minimized. That is, all the intervals must be scheduled, but the objective is to minimize the usage of resources.

Another variation is when there are m processors instead of a single processor. I.e., m different tasks can run in parallel. See identical-machines scheduling.

Single-machine scheduling is also a very similar problem.
