= Embedded Java =

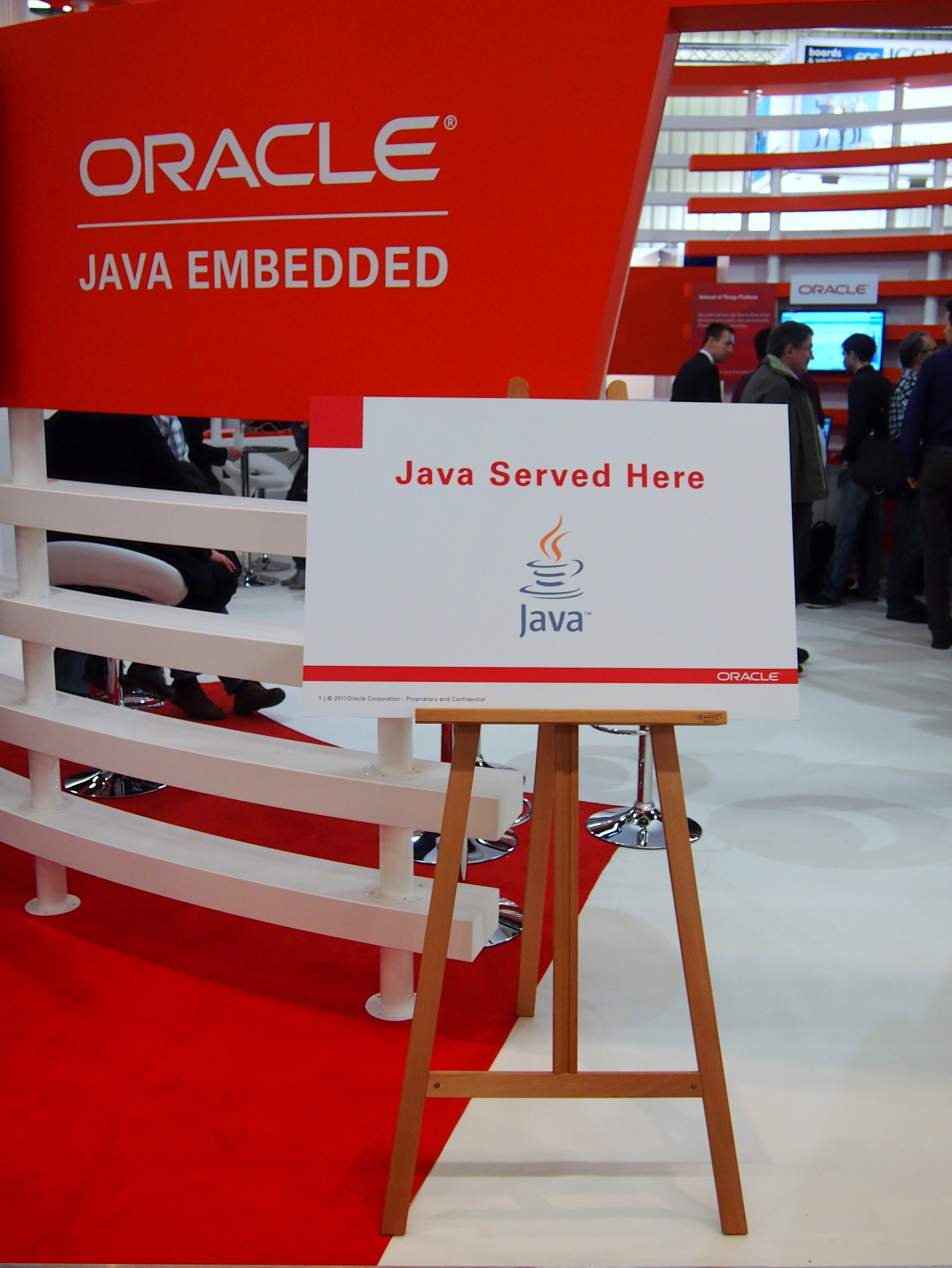
Embedded Java at the Embedded World fair 2014 in Nuremberg

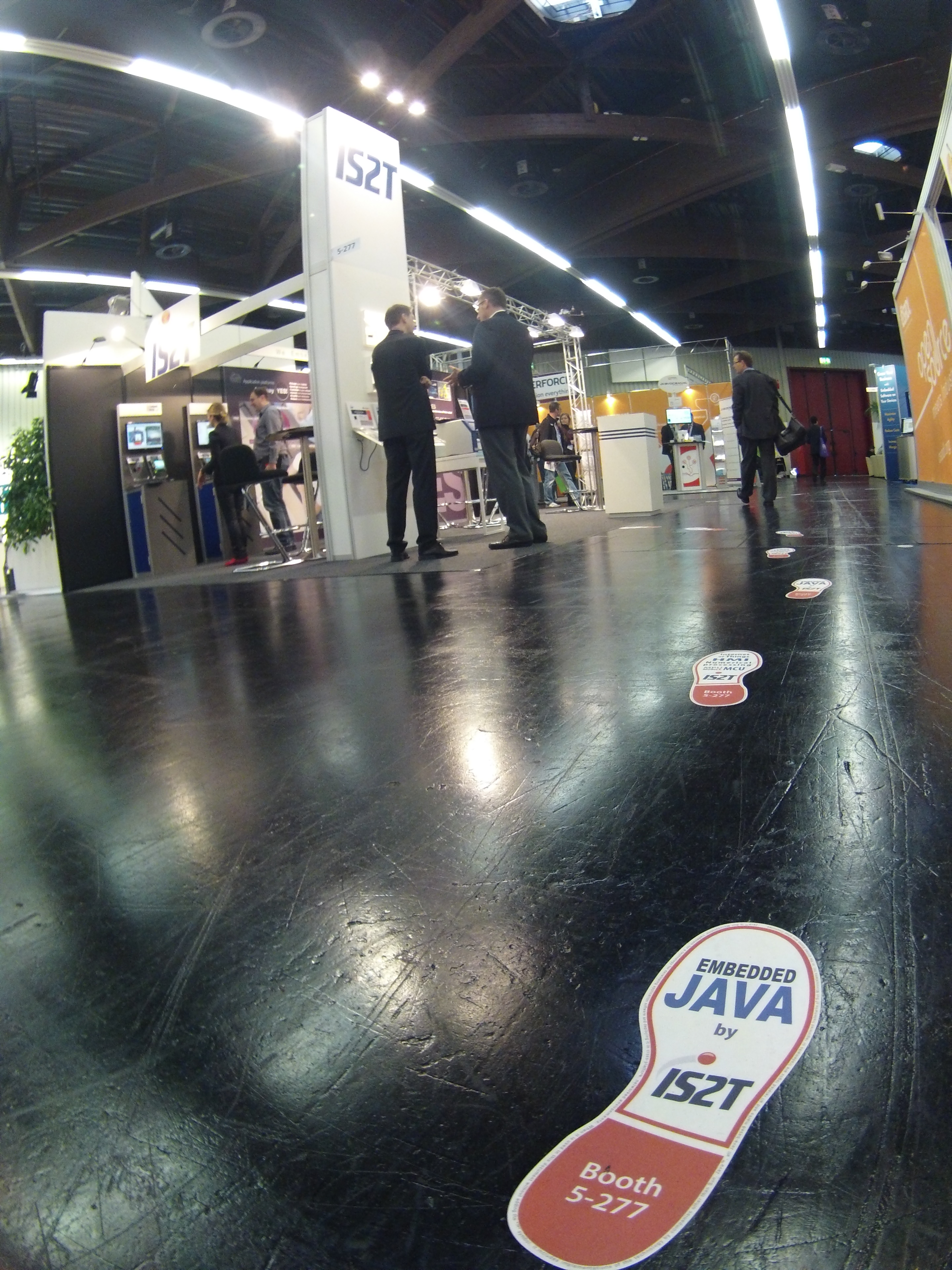
IS2T embedded Java demonstration at Embedded World exhibition 2014 in Nuremberg

Embedded Java refers to versions of the Java program language that are designed for embedded systems. Since 2010 embedded Java implementations have come closer to standard Java, and are now virtually identical to the Java Standard Edition. Since Java 9 customization of the Java Runtime through modularization removes the need for specialized Java profiles targeting embedded devices.

== History ==
Although in the past some differences existed between embedded Java and traditional PC based Java, the only difference now is that embedded Java code in these embedded systems is mainly contained in constrained memory, such as flash memory. A complete convergence has taken place since 2010, and now Java software components running on large systems can run directly with no recompilation at all on design-to-cost mass-production devices (such as consumers, industrial, white goods, healthcare, metering, smart markets in general)

== CORE embedded Java API for a unified Embedded Java ecosystem ==
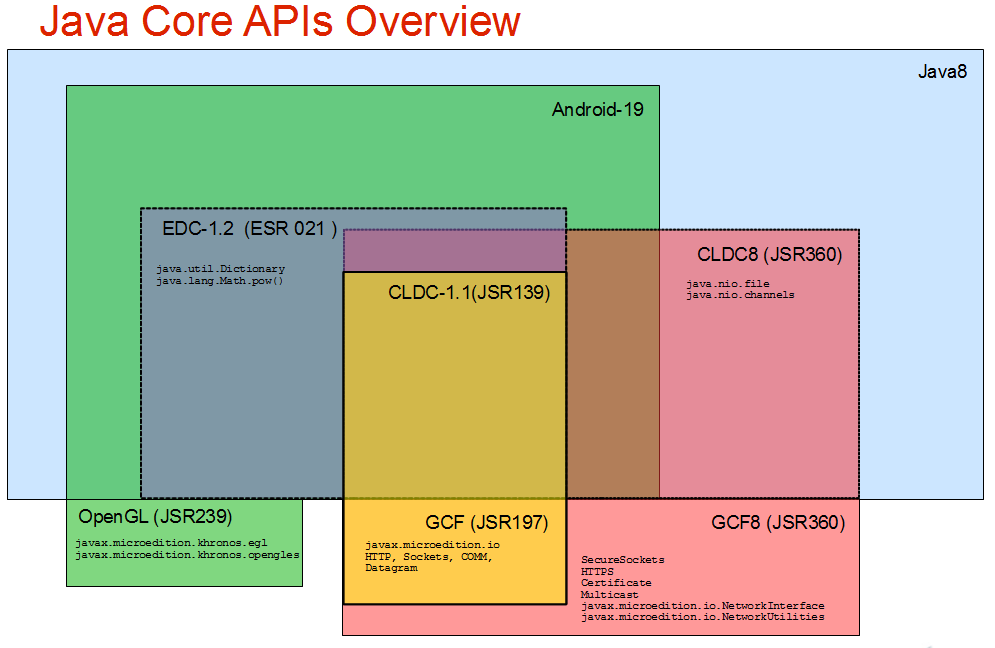
The core Java API

In order for a software component to run on any Java system, it must target the core minimal API provided by the different providers of the embedded Java ecosystem. Companies share the same eight packages of pre-written programs. The packages (java.lang, java.io, java.util, ... ) form the CORE Embedded Java API, which means that embedded programmers using the Java language can use them in order to make any worthwhile use of the Java language.

== Old distinctions between SE embedded API and ME embedded API from ORACLE ==
Java SE embedded is based on desktop Java Platform, Standard Edition. It is designed to be used on systems with at least 32 MB of RAM, and can work on Linux ARM, x86, or Power ISA, and Windows XP and Windows XP Embedded architectures.

Java ME embedded used to be based on the Connected Device Configuration subset of Java Platform, Micro Edition. It is designed to be used on systems with at least 8 MB of RAM, and can work on Linux ARM, PowerPC, or MIPS architecture.

== See also ==
- Excelsior JET Embedded
- Sun SPOT Sun SPOT Project
- Real-Time Specification for Java
- Azul Systems
- JamaicaVM
- STM32 STM32J part numbers. MCU that embeds an embedded Java engine
