= Server Routing Protocol =

Server Routing Protocol (SRP) is the proprietary network protocol used to transfer data between a BlackBerry Enterprise Server and the Research In Motion BlackBerry infrastructure.

SRP communication takes place on TCP port 3101 by default. SRP work in two different part: 1. SRP ID 2. SRP Authorization Key

During BlackBerry Enterprise Server installation, the unique Server Routing Protocol Identifier (SRP ID) and SRP Authentication Key must be entered. The SRP ID and SRP Authentication Key register and authenticate the BlackBerry Enterprise Server on the network. The work flow is same like any authentication process. The SRP ID can be thought of as a login name and the Authentication Key as a password. The SRP ID uniquely identifies the BlackBerry Enterprise Server on the network. When the BlackBerry Enterprise Server connects to the BlackBerry Infrastructure, it must provide these two pieces of information to connect and open a session.

If the BlackBerry Enterprise Server is connected to the BlackBerry Infrastructure and another server attempts to connect using the same SRP ID and Authentication Key, the BlackBerry Infrastructure drops the connection to the BlackBerry Enterprise Server. It then creates a session with the newly connecting server. Multiple concurrent connections cannot be made with the same SRP ID.

When a BlackBerry device attempts to send a message, it must include the SRP ID for the BlackBerry Enterprise Server.

Note: In the Service Book menu on the BlackBerry device, open the Desktop (CMIME) service book. The specified unique identifier (UID) value is the SRP ID of the BlackBerry Enterprise Server from which the BlackBerry device attempts to send messages.

When the BlackBerry device sends a message, it arrives at the BlackBerry Infrastructure. The message contains the SRP ID pulled from the service book UID value. The BlackBerry Infrastructure uses this information to send the message to the corresponding BlackBerry Enterprise Server for decryption and processing.

Ref#

== See also ==
- BlackBerry Enterprise Server
