= ERIKA Enterprise =

Real-time operating system

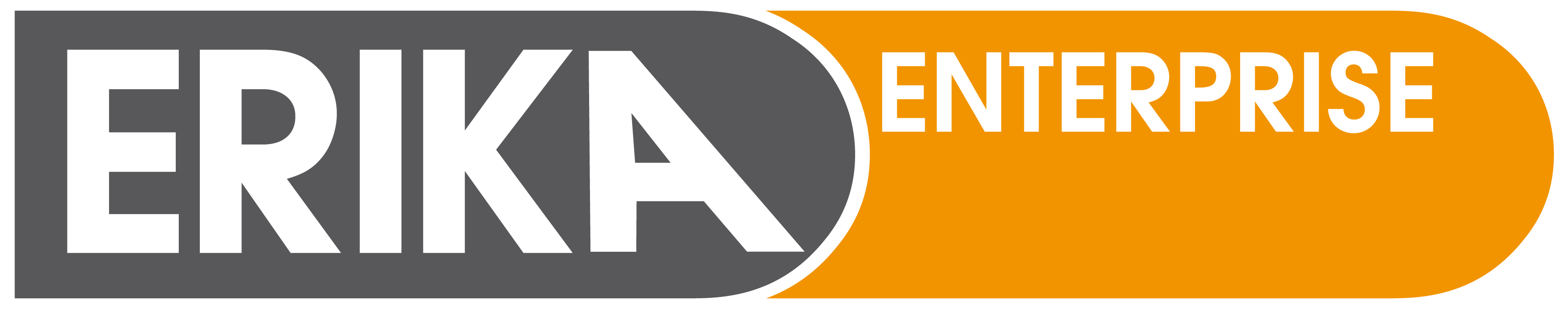
- Developer: Evidence Srl, ReTiS Lab, others
- Written in: C
- OS family: Embedded operating systems
- Working state: Current
- Source model: Open source
- Initial release: 2002; 24 years ago
- Latest release: 3.0-GH65 / May 27, 2019; 6 years ago
- Repository: ERIKA 3 repo (Archive); ERIKA 2 repo
- Marketing target: Automotive, Wireless sensor networks, HVAC
- Available in: English
- Supported platforms: ARM (ARM7, ARM9, Cortex-M, Cortex-A), AVR, Arduino, TI Stellaris Cortex M4, MSP430, Microchip PIC24, Microchip PIC32, STMicroelectronics ST10, TriCore, Freescale S12XS, S12G, PowerPC 5000 PPC MPC5674F, PPC MPC5668G Fado, PPC MPC5674F Mamba, PPC MPC5643L Leopard, NXP LPCXpresso, Altera Nios II, Renesas R2xx, x86-64
- Kernel type: Monolithic
- License: GPL
- Official website: ERIKA 3 website; ERIKA 2 website

ERIKA Enterprise is a real-time operating system (RTOS) kernel for embedded systems, which is OSEK/VDX certified. It is free and open source software released under a GNU General Public License (GPL). The RTOS also includes RT-Druid, an integrated development environment (IDE) based on Eclipse.

ERIKA Enterprise implements various conformance classes, including the standard OSEK/VDX conformance classes BCC1, BCC2, ECC1, ECC2, CCCA, and CCCB. Also, ERIKA provides other custom conformance classes named FP (fixed priority), EDF (earliest deadline first scheduling), and FRSH (an implementation of resource reservation protocols).

Due to the collaboration with the Tool & Methodologies team of Magneti Marelli Powertrain & Electronics, the automotive kernel (BCC1, BCC2, ECC1, ECC2, multicore, memory protection, and kernel fixed priority with Diab 5.5.1 compiler) is MISRA C 2004 compliant using FlexeLint 9.00h under the configuration suggested by Magneti Marelli.

In August 2012 ERIKA Enterprise officially received the OSEK/VDX certification; see below.

== History ==
ERIKA Enterprise began in the year 2000 with the aim to support multicore devices for the automotive markets. The main milestones are:

- 2000: support for STMicroelectronics ST10
- 2001: support for ARM7
- 2002: support for Janus, a prototype dual ARM7 system for the automotive market
- 2004: support for Hitachi H8
- 2005: support for Altera Nios II, with support for partitioning on multicore designs; availability of the RT-Druid code generator
- 2006: support for Microchip dsPIC
- 2007: support for Atmel AVR Micaz
- 2009: announced ERIKA website on TuxFamily
- 2010: support for TriCore, Freescale S12XS, Freescale PowerPC 5000 PPC MPC5674F Mamba, Microchip PIC24, Microchip PIC32, Lattice MICO32, eSi-RISC
- 2011: support for Texas Instruments MSP430, Renesas R2xx, Freescale S12G, Freescale PowerPC 5000 PPC MPC5668G Fado
- 2012: support for ARM Cortex-M, Atmel AVR (Arduino), TI Stellaris Cortex M4, Freescale PowerPC 5000 PPC MPC5643L Leopard, NXP LPCXpresso. ERIKA Enterprise received OSEK/VDX certification.
- 2013: ERIKA Enterprise is supported by E4Coder automatic code generation tool.
- 2014: OSEK/VDX certification for Tricore AURIX
- 2017: RTOS was rewritten from scratch; new version (3) has proper support for multicore platforms (i.e., one binary for multiple cores), better support for memory protection, and an easier build system. The source code is now maintained on a GitHub repository.
- 2017: ERIKA v2.8.0 is released in November 2017.
- 2018: Multicore and AUTOSAR Scalability Class 1 added to ERIKA3. Graphical editor now available for the OIL file.
- 2019: On May 24, Erika released version GH65. Since August 27, 2019, the official website of ERIKA has not been updated up to the present date of April 2, 2024.
- 2023: During 2023, the codebase of the ERIKA v3 kernel, release GH65, has been contributed to the AUTOSAR Consortium under the AUTOSAR APL License, under the name "OpenERIKA". The development of a configurator OpenDruid based on ARXML; ARTOP, XText also started.
- 2024: On May 10, the first release of OpenERIKA has been released, with support for NXP S32K14x
- 2025/2026: The project added support for Infineon Tricore, Arduino, and additional compilers. The AUTOSAR Working group WG-TNT started cooperating for further development of the ARTI standard. The official wiki page is now a "wiki page". hosted in the AUTOSAR Gitlab (available to AUTOSAR Members).

== Licensing ==
Version 2 of the RTOS was released under GPL linking exception. Version 3 of the RTOS (also called ERIKA3) is released under plain GNU General Public License (GPL), with the linking exception sold on request.. OpenERIKA has been released under the AUTOSAR APD License.

== Industrial usage ==
- In 2010, Cobra Automotive Technology announced support for ERIKA Enterprise
- In 2010, EnSilica and Pebble Bay consultancy ported ERIKA Enterprise to a family of configurable soft processor cores for automotive systems
- In 2010, Magneti Marelli Powertrain announced support for ERIKA Enterprise.
- In 2011, FAAM Spa announced support for ERIKA Enterprise.
- In 2011, Aprilia Racing announced support for ERIKA Enterprise.

== Hardware support ==
The ERIKA Enterprise kernel directly supports:

- FLEX Boards.
- Easy lab boards
- Nvidia Jetson TX1 and TX2

Other evaluation boards are supported.
