= JamaicaVM =

- Developer: aicas GmbH
- Stable release: 8.11.1 / December 17, 2025; 0 days ago
- Written in: C, Assembly, Java
- Type: Java Virtual Machine and Java Library
- License: Commercial
- Website: www.aicas.com/wp/products-services/jamaicavm/

The JamaicaVM is a virtual machine and build environment for developing and running realtime Java programs. It includes a deterministic garbage collector and implements the RTSJ. It is designed for use in both realtime and embedded systems. It provides the base runtime environment for JamaicaCAR.

== See also ==
- Real-time Java
- Embedded Java
