= Fixed-priority pre-emptive scheduling =

Scheduling system commonly used in real-time systems

Fixed-priority preemptive scheduling is a scheduling system commonly used in real-time systems. With fixed priority preemptive scheduling, the scheduler ensures that at any given time, the processor executes the highest priority task of all those tasks that are currently ready to execute.

The preemptive scheduler has a clock interrupt task that can provide the scheduler with options to switch after the task has had a given period to execute—the time slice. This scheduling system has the advantage of making sure no task hogs the processor for any time longer than the time slice. However, this scheduling scheme is vulnerable to process or thread lockout: since priority is given to higher-priority tasks, the lower-priority tasks could wait an indefinite amount of time. One common method of arbitrating this situation is aging, which gradually increments the priority of waiting processes and threads, ensuring that they will all eventually execute. Most real-time operating systems (RTOSs) have preemptive schedulers. Also turning off time slicing effectively gives you the non-preemptive RTOS.

Preemptive scheduling is often differentiated with cooperative scheduling, in which a task can run continuously from start to end without being preempted by other tasks. To have a task switch, the task must explicitly call the scheduler. Cooperative scheduling is used in a few RTOS such as Salvo or TinyOS.
