= Con Kolivas =

Australian physician

- Born: Melbourne, Victoria, Australia
- Occupation: Anesthesiologist
- Known for: Linux kernel development

Con Kolivas is a Greek-Australian anaesthetist. He has worked as a computer programmer on the Linux kernel and on the development of the cryptographic currency mining software CGMiner. His Linux contributions include patches for the kernel to improve its desktop performance, particularly reducing I/O impact.

== Linux ==
Kolivas is most notable for his work with CPU scheduling, most significantly his implementation of "fair scheduling", which inspired Ingo Molnár to develop his Completely Fair Scheduler, as a replacement for the earlier O(1) scheduler, crediting Kolivas in his announcement. Kolivas developed several CPU schedulers such as the Staircase in 2004, then Rotating Staircase Deadline (RSDL), and subsequently Staircase Deadline (SD) schedulers to address interactivity concerns of the Linux kernel with respect to desktop computing. Additionally, he has written a "swap prefetch" patch, which allows processes to respond quickly after the operating system has been idle for some time and their working sets have been swapped out. Many of his experimental "-CK" patches, such as his prefetching and scheduling code, did not get merged with the official Linux kernel.

In 2007, Kolivas announced in an email that he would cease developing for the Linux kernel. Discussing his reasons in an interview, he expressed frustration with aspects of the mainline kernel development process, which he felt did not give sufficient priority to desktop interactivity, in addition to hacking taking a toll on his health, work and family.

He has also written a benchmarking tool called ConTest that can be used to compare the performance of different kernel versions.

On 31 August 2009, Kolivas posted a new scheduler called BFS (Brain Fuck Scheduler). It is designed for desktop use and to be very simple (hence it may not scale well to machines with many CPU cores). Con Kolivas did not intend to get it merged into the mainline kernel. He has since retired BFS in favour of MuQSS, a rewritten implementation of the same concept.

== CGMiner ==
On 13 July 2011, Kolivas introduced a new piece of software for "windows, linux, OSX and other" called CGMiner, which is used for mining cryptocurrencies such as bitcoin and Litecoin.
