= Multilevel queue =

Method to prioritise work and vary scheduling

Multi-level queueing, used at least since the late 1950s/early 1960s, is a queue with a predefined number of levels. Items get assigned to a particular level at insert (using some predefined algorithm), and thus cannot be moved to another level (unlike in the multilevel feedback queue). Items get removed from the queue by removing all items from a level, and then moving to the next. If an item is added to a level above, the "fetching" restarts from there. Each level of the queue is free to use its own scheduling, thus adding greater flexibility than merely having multiple levels in a queue.

== Process Scheduling ==
Multi-level queue scheduling algorithm is used in scenarios where the processes can be classified into groups based on property like process type, CPU time, IO access, memory size, etc. One general classification of the processes is foreground processes and background processes. In a multi-level queue scheduling algorithm, there will be 'n' number of queues, where 'n' is the number of groups the processes are classified into. Each queue will be assigned a priority and will have its own scheduling algorithm like Round-robin scheduling or FCFS. For the process in a queue to execute, all the queues of priority higher than it should be empty, meaning the process in those high priority queues should have completed its execution. In this scheduling algorithm, once assigned to a queue, the process will not move to any other queues.

Consider the following table with the arrival time, execute time and type of the process (foreground or background - where foreground processes are given high priority) to understand non pre-emptive and pre-emptive multilevel scheduling in depth with FCFS algorithm for both the queues:

Process Name	Arrival Time	Execute Time	Type
P0	0	5	Foreground
P1	1	8	Background
P2	3	7	Background
P3	4	3	Foreground
P4	5	3	Foreground
P5	8	11	Background
P6	15	3	Foreground
P7	25	4	Foreground

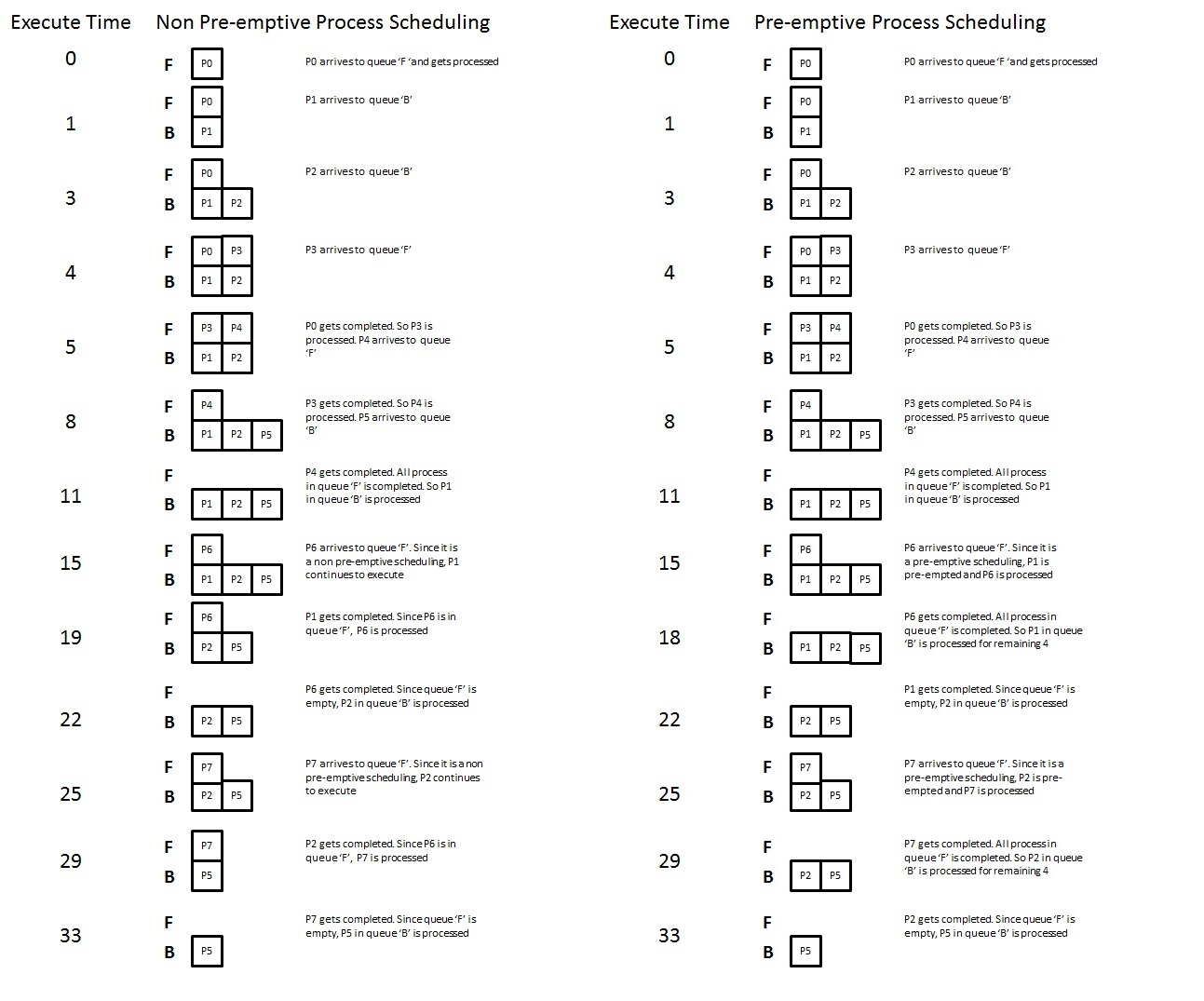
Non pre-emptive and pre-emptive multi-level queue scheduling

== See also ==
- Fair-share scheduling
- Lottery scheduling
