= System Contention Scope =

In computer science, The System Contention Scope is one of two thread-scheduling schemes used in operating systems. This scheme is used by the kernel to decide which kernel-level thread to schedule onto a CPU, wherein all threads (as opposed to only user-level threads, as in the Process Contention Scope scheme) in the system compete for the CPU. Operating systems that use only the one-to-one model, such as Windows, Linux, and Solaris, schedule threads using only System Contention Scope.
