= SJF =

The initialism SJF might refer to:

- Swedish Union of Journalists
- Shortest job first or shortest job next, a scheduling algorithm
- New Zealand rock band Straitjacket Fits
