= OSADL =

German software organisation

The Open Source Automation Development Lab eG (OSADL) is a German organization intended to promote and coordinate the development of open source software for the machine, machine tool, and automation industry. As of March 2013, it has more than 40 member companies from around the world, including machine manufacturers, manufacturers of automation hardware and software, semiconductor companies, user associations and open source software service providers. Membership fees are used for the most part to fund development of the software.

OSADL was founded on December 8, 2005. It was assigned the cooperative register number 440085 at the Stuttgart, Germany, District Court in August 2006.

OSADL is a member of OPC Foundation which governs the OPC UA industrial automation standard, in which the lab is also involved.

== Preamble of the articles of incorporation of the cooperative ==
"The automation industry and its suppliers are profiting greatly from Open Source operating systems such as Linux since they guarantee long production cycles, rapid troubleshooting and the independence of individual software manufacturers. However, this branch requires specific expansions of the operating system such as real-time capabilities, the compatibility with these expansions must be certifiable, and standardized software interfaces must be available. The development of these requirements is the goal of the Open Source Automation Development Lab (OSADL)."

== Working groups and projects ==
Over time a number of working groups has been established and projects participated in, this lists some of the more prominent:

- Ingo Molnár's and Thomas Gleixner's Linux Real-time Preempt Patches (a.k.a. PREEMPT_RT)
- Kernel-based Virtual Machine and Real-time Preempt Patches
- Critical Safety Linux
- Universal industrial I/O framework
- Upstream submission of kernel components to Mainline Linux
- Conformance tests of board support packages
- Tools and libraries to facilitate the migration to Linux
- Quality assurance of the Linux kernel and its real-time capabilities in a "QA Farm"
- License Compliance Audit to help companies follow the obligations of Open Source licenses
- Adding TSN and publish/subscribe capabilities to open62541 (implements OPC UA industrial automation)

== Feedback ==
The relevance of the Linux operating system for embedded systems and OSADL's role to foster its real-time capabilities are recognized.
