= Resource allocation =

Assignment of resources among possible uses

In economics, resource allocation is the assignment of available resources to various uses. In the context of an entire economy, resources can be allocated by various means, such as markets, or planning.

In project management, resource allocation or resource management is the scheduling of activities and the resources required by those activities while taking into consideration both the resource availability and the project time.

== Economics ==
In economics, the field of public finance deals with three broad areas: macroeconomic stabilization, the distribution of income and wealth, and the allocation of resources. Much of the study of resource allocation focuses on identifying the conditions under which particular mechanisms lead to Pareto efficient outcomes, in which no party's situation can be improved without hurting that of another.

In a study on the ethical foundations of cost-effectiveness analysis in the context of utilitarianism, two researchers suggest that "the long-term social and political project of re-directing resources away from activities that undermine human flourishing and toward those that are conducive, is one of the most urgent of our era".

== Strategic planning ==
In strategic planning, resource allocation is a plan for using available resources, for example human resources, especially in the near term, to achieve goals for the future. It is the process of allocating scarce resources among the various projects or business units. There are a number of approaches to solving resource allocation problems e.g. resources can be allocated using a manual approach, an algorithmic approach (see below), or a combination of both.

There may be contingency mechanisms such as a priority ranking of items excluded from the plan, showing which items to fund if more resources should become available and a priority ranking of some items included in the plan, showing which items should be sacrificed if total funding must be reduced.

== Algorithms ==
Resource allocation may be decided by using computer programs applied to a specific domain to automatically and dynamically distribute resources to applicants.

This is especially common in electronic devices dedicated to routing and communication. For example, channel allocation in Wireless communication may be decided by a base transceiver station using an appropriate algorithm.

One class of resource whereby applicants bid for the best resource(s) according to their balance of "money", as in an online auction business model (see also auction theory).

In one paper on CPU time slice allocation an auction algorithm is compared to proportional share scheduling.

== See also ==
- Allocative efficiency – When production relates to consumer preferences in an economy
- Collective problem solving – Process of achieving a goal by overcoming obstacles
- Corruption
- Earned value management – Project management technique
- Fair division
- Health care rationing – Facet of health economics
- Prioritization – Arranging things in order of importance
- Project management – Practice of leading the work of a team to achieve goals and criteria at a specified time
- Project planning – Aspect of project management which uses schedules to plan and report progress
- Stochastic scheduling – Problems involving random attributes
- Welfare economics – Field of economics to evaluate well-being
