= SJN =

SJN may refer to:

- Shortest job next, a scheduling policy
- ISO 639-3 code for Sindarin, a fictional language devised by J. R. R. Tolkien
