= Ingo Molnár =

Linux kernel programmer

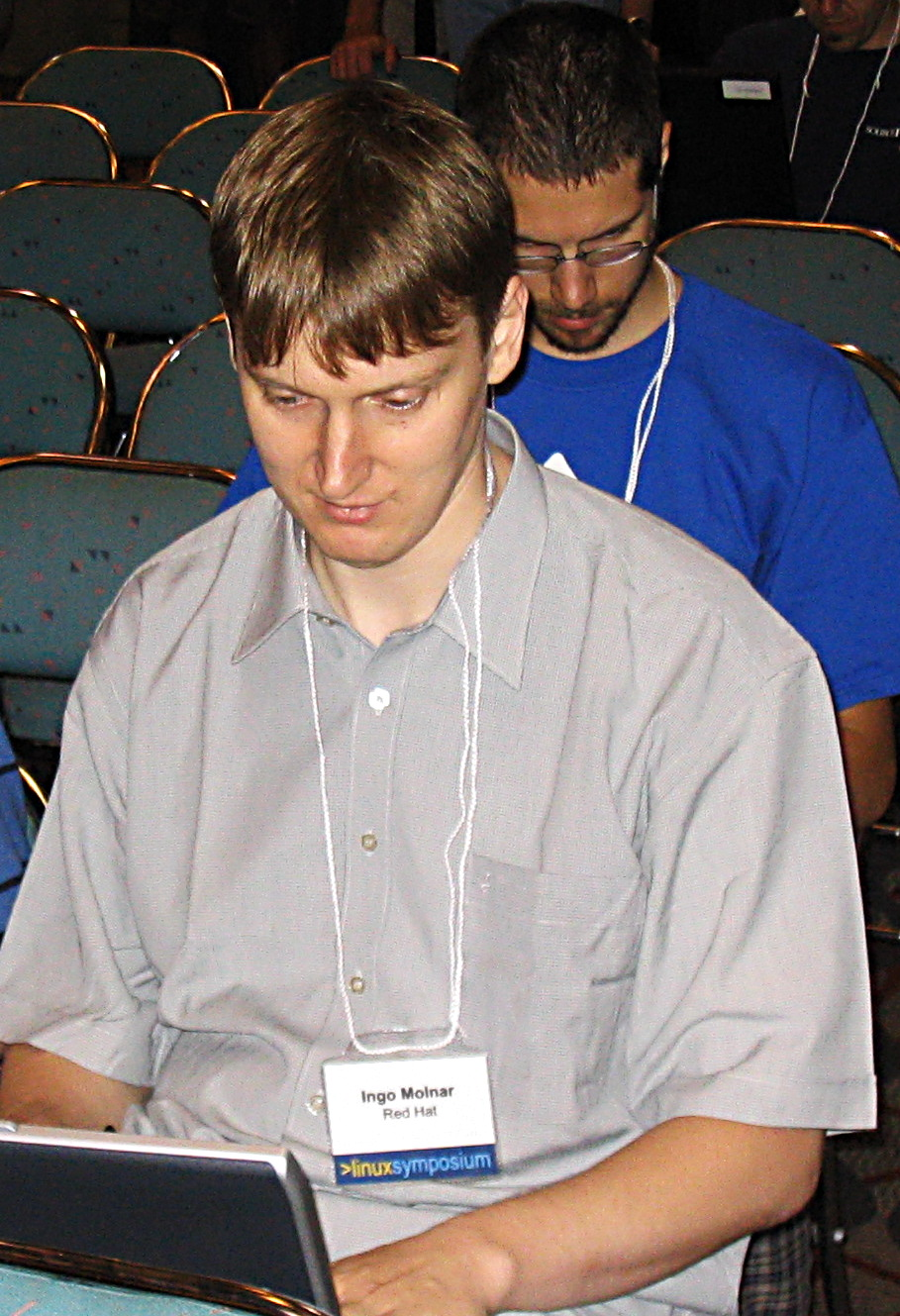
- Occupation: Programmer
- Employer: Red Hat
- Known for: Completely Fair Scheduler

Ingo Molnár, employed by Red Hat as of May 2013, is a Hungarian Linux hacker. He is known for his contributions to the operating system in terms of security and performance.

== Life and career ==
Molnár studied at Eötvös Loránd University.

== Work ==
Some of his additions to the Linux kernel include the O(1) scheduler of Linux-2.6.0 and the Completely Fair Scheduler of Linux-2.6.23, the in-kernel TUX HTTP / FTP server, as well as his work to enhance thread handling. He also wrote a kernel security feature called "Exec Shield", which prevents stack-based buffer overflow exploits in the x86 architecture by disabling the execute permission for the stack.

Together with Thomas Gleixner, he worked on the real-time preemption (PREEMPT RT) patch set, which aims to reduce the maximum thread switching latency of the Linux kernel from an unbounded number of milliseconds to down to bounded values in the order of tens of microseconds (depending on the system). As of 2011, Thomas Gleixner is working on further improving the patch and getting important infrastructure patches of the patch set merged into the Mainline Linux kernel.

Between Linux 2.6.21 and Linux 2.6.24, he worked on the Completely Fair Scheduler (CFS) which was inspired by the scheduler work of Con Kolivas. CFS replaced the previous process scheduler of the Linux kernel with Linux-2.6.23.

In 2012 Molnar criticized the Linux desktop as "not free enough" for the users with respect to the applications. He argues that the typically used system of software distribution and deployment by a centrally organized Linux distributions is not fast and flexible enough to satisfy the requirements of users and application producers alike. Molnár suggests a decentral deployment method (similar to Autopackage, Zero Install, or the Klik-successor AppImage) which allows a more flexible application infrastructure formed by a stable platform and independent software providers.

In early 2022, he submitted an RFC on a set of about 2300 patches, called "Fast Kernel Headers", that are intended to improve kernel compile times by 50-80% and at the same time significantly reduce the problems created by the hierarchy and dependencies of include files, the so-called "dependency hell".

== Quotes ==
On the question, why the Linux desktop has not been adopted by the mainstream users yet:

The basic failure of the free Linux desktop is that it's, perversely, not free enough ...

Desktop Linux distributions are trying to "own" 20 thousand application packages consisting of over a billion lines of code and have created parallel, mostly closed ecosystems around them ...

The Linux package management method system works reasonably well in the enterprise (which is a hierarchical, centrally planned organization in most cases), but desktop Linux on the other hand stopped scaling 10 years ago, at the 1000 packages limit ...
