= Analytical Performance Modeling =

Analytical Performance Modeling is a method to model the behaviour of a system in a spreadsheet. It is used in Software performance testing. It allows evaluation of design options and system sizing based on actual or anticipated business usage. It is therefore much faster and cheaper than performance testing, though it requires thorough understanding of the hardware platforms.

== The Model ==
The model is fed with measurements of transaction resource demands (CPU, disk I/O, LAN, WAN), weighted by the transaction-mix (business transactions per unit of time). The weighted transaction resource demands are added-up to obtain the resource demands and divided by the resource capacity to obtain the resource loads. Changes in response time can also be predicted by the model. For example, in a simple case with a single resource, the response time formula: R=S/(1-U) where R=response_time, S=service_time, U=utilization, will calculate the response time as the utilization of that resource varies between 0=0% busy to 1=100% busy. This formula is a good approximation of the more complex math of queueing theory and requires adjustment when dealing with multiple resources.

== See also ==
- Roofline model
