= Fernando J. Corbató =

American computer scientist (1926–2019)

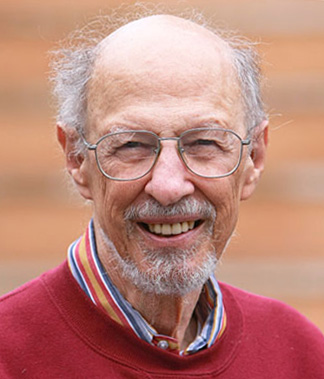
- Born: Fernando José Corbató; July 1, 1926; Oakland, California, U.S.
- Died: July 12, 2019 (aged 93); Newburyport, Massachusetts, U.S.
- Education: University of California, Los Angeles; California Institute of Technology (BS); Massachusetts Institute of Technology (MS, PhD)
- Known for: Multics
- Spouses: Isabel Blandford (m. 1962; died 1973): Emily Gluck
- Children: 2
- Awards: Turing Award (1990); Computer History Museum Fellow (2012)
- Scientific career
- Fields: Computer science
- Workplaces: Massachusetts Institute of Technology
- Thesis: A calculation of the energy bands of the graphite crystal by means of the tight-binding method (1956)
- Doctoral advisor: John C. Slater
- Doctoral students: Jerome H. Saltzer

Fernando José "Corby" Corbató (July 1, 1926 – July 12, 2019) was an American computer scientist, notable as a pioneer in the development of time-sharing operating systems. He won the 1990 ACM Turing Award.

== Life and career ==
Fernando José Corbató was born on July 1, 1926, in Oakland, California, to Hermenegildo Corbató, a Spanish literature professor from Villarreal, Spain, and Charlotte Corbató (née Jensen), a Danish American. In 1930, the Corbató family moved to Los Angeles for Hermenegildo's job at the University of California, Los Angeles (UCLA).

In 1943, Corbató enrolled at UCLA, but due to World War II he was recruited by the Navy during his first year. During the war, Corbató "debug[ged] an incredible array of equipment," inspiring his future career.

Corbató left the Navy in 1946 and enrolled at the California Institute of Technology, where he received a Bachelor of Science in physics in 1950. He then earned a PhD in physics from the Massachusetts Institute of Technology in 1956. He joined MIT's Computation Center immediately after graduation, became a professor in 1965, and stayed at MIT until he retired.

The first time-sharing system he was associated with was known as the MIT Compatible Time-Sharing System (CTSS), an early version of which was demonstrated in 1961. Corbató is credited with the first use of passwords to secure access to files on a large computer system, though he later claimed that this rudimentary security method had proliferated and became unmanageable.

The experience with developing CTSS led to a second project, Multics, which was adopted by General Electric for its high-end computer systems (later acquired by Honeywell). Multics pioneered many concepts now used in modern operating systems, including a hierarchical file system, ring-oriented security, access-control lists, single-level store, dynamic linking, and extensive on-line reconfiguration for reliable service. Multics, while not particularly commercially successful in itself, directly inspired Ken Thompson to develop Unix, the direct descendants of which are still in extremely wide use; Unix also served as a direct model for many other subsequent operating system designs.

== Personal life and death ==
Corbató married programmer Isabel Blandford in 1962, with whom he had two daughters, Carolyn Corbató Stone and Nancy Corbató. Isabel died in 1973.

Corbató had a second wife, Emily (née Gluck). He had two step-sons, David Gish and Jason Gish; a brother, Charles; and five grandchildren.

Corbató lived on Temple Street in West Newton, Massachusetts. He died on July 12, 2019, in Newburyport, Massachusetts, at the age of 93 due to complications from diabetes.

== Awards ==
Among many awards, Corbató received the Turing Award in 1990, "for his pioneering work in organizing the concepts and leading the development of the general-purpose, large-scale, time-sharing and resource-sharing computer systems."

In 2012, he was made a Fellow of the Computer History Museum "for his pioneering work on timesharing and the Multics operating system."

== Legacy ==
Corbató is sometimes known for "Corbató's Law," which states:

The number of lines of code a programmer can write in a fixed period of time is the same, independent of the language used.

== Publications ==
- F. J. Corbató, M. M. Daggett, R. C. Daley, An Experimental Time-Sharing System (IFIPS 1962) is a good description of CTSS
- F. J. Corbató (editor), The Compatible Time-Sharing System: A Programmer's Guide (M.I.T. Press, 1963)
- F. J. Corbató, V. A. Vyssotsky, Introduction and Overview of the Multics System (AFIPS 1965) is a good introduction to Multics
- Corbató, F. J. (May 6, 1969). "PL/I As a Tool for System Programming". Datamation. pp. 68–76. ISSN 0011-6963.
- F. J. Corbató, C. T. Clingen, J. H. Saltzer, Multics -- The First Seven Years (AFIPS, 1972) is an excellent review, after a considerable period of use and improvement
- F. J. Corbató, C. T. Clingen, A Managerial View of the Multics System Development ("Conference on Research Directions in Software Technology", Providence, Rhode Island, 1977) is a fascinating look at what it was like to manage such a large software project
- F. J. Corbató, On Building Systems That Will Fail (Turing Award Lecture, 1991)
- F. J. Corbató, A paging experiment with the Multics system. Included in a Festschrift published in honor of Prof. P.M. Morse. MIT Press, Cambridge, Mass., 1969.

== See also ==
- Incompatible Timesharing System
- Multilevel feedback queue
