= Proportional share scheduling =

Proportional share scheduling is a type of scheduling that preallocates certain amount of CPU time to each of the processes. In a proportional share algorithm every job has a weight, and jobs receive a share of the available resources proportional to the weight of every job.
