= CPU-bound =

Computer program whose performance is heavily dependent on the speed of the CPU

In computer science, a task, job or process is said to be CPU-bound (or compute-bound) when the time it takes for it to complete is determined principally by the speed of the central processor. The term can also refer to the condition a computer running such a workload is in, in which its processor utilization is high, perhaps at 100% usage for many seconds or minutes, and interrupts generated by peripherals may be processed slowly or be indefinitely delayed.

== As applied to jobs ==
CPU-bound jobs will spend most of their execution time on actual computation ("number crunching") as opposed to e.g. communicating with and waiting for peripherals such as network or storage devices (which would make them I/O bound instead). Such jobs can often benefit from parallelization techniques such as multithreading if the underlying algorithm is amenable to it, allowing them to distribute their workload among multiple CPU cores and be limited by its multi-core rather than single-core performance.

== As applied to computers ==
The concept of CPU-bounding was developed during early computers, when data paths between computer components were simpler, and it was possible to visually see one component working while another was idle. Example components were CPU, tape drives, hard disks, card-readers, and printers. Computers that predominantly used peripherals were characterized as I/O bound. Establishing that a computer is frequently CPU-bound implies that upgrading the CPU or optimizing code will improve the overall computer performance.

With the advent of multiple buses, parallel processing, multiprogramming, preemptive scheduling, advanced graphics cards, advanced sound cards and generally, more decentralized loads, it became less likely to identify one particular component as always being a bottleneck. It is likely that a computer's bottleneck shifts rapidly between components. Furthermore, in modern computers it is possible to have 100% CPU utilization with minimal impact to another component. Finally, tasks required of modern computers often emphasize quite different components, so that resolving a bottleneck for one task may not affect the performance of another. For these reasons, upgrading a CPU does not always have a dramatic effect. The concept of being CPU-bound is now one of many factors considered in modern computing performance.

== See also ==
- I/O-bound
- Memory-bound
