= Temporal isolation =

In computer science, temporal isolation is the capability of a set of processes running on the same system to run without interferences concerning their temporal constraints among each other.

Specifically, there is temporal isolation among processes whenever the ability for each process to respect its own timing constraints (e.g. terminating a computation within a specified time) does not depend on the temporal behavior of other unrelated processes running on the same system, thus sharing with it a set of resources such as the CPU, disk, network, etc.

Operating systems able to provide such guarantees to running processes are suitable for hosting real-time applications.

== See also ==
- Temporal isolation among virtual machines
