= Earliest eligible virtual deadline first scheduling =

Dynamic algorithm for process scheduler

Earliest eligible virtual deadline first (EEVDF) is a dynamic priority proportional share scheduling algorithm for soft real-time systems.

== Algorithm ==
EEVDF was first described in the 1995 paper "Earliest Eligible Virtual Deadline First : A Flexible and Accurate Mechanism for Proportional Share Resource Allocation" by Ion Stoica and Hussein Abdel-Wahab. It uses notions of virtual time, eligible time, virtual requests and virtual deadlines for determining scheduling priority. It has the property that when a job keeps requesting service, the amount of service obtained is always within the maximum quantum size of what it is entitled.

== Linux kernel scheduler ==
In 2023, Peter Zijlstra proposed replacing the Completely Fair Scheduler (CFS) in the Linux kernel with an EEVDF process scheduler. The aim was to remove the need for CFS "latency nice" patches. The EEVDF scheduler replaced CFS in version 6.6 of the Linux kernel.

== See also ==
- Brain Fuck Scheduler
- Earliest deadline first scheduling (EDF)
- nice (Unix)
- SCHED_DEADLINE
