= O(1) scheduler =

Historical Linux 2.6 kernel process scheduler

Location of the "O(1) scheduler" (a process scheduler) in a simplified structure of the Linux kernel

An O(1) scheduler (pronounced "O of 1 scheduler", "Big O of 1 scheduler", or "constant time scheduler") using the terminology from Big O notation in algorithm analysis is a kernel scheduling design that can schedule processes within a constant amount of time, regardless of how many processes are running on the operating system. This is an improvement over previously used O(n) schedulers, which schedule processes in an amount of time that scales linearly based on the amounts of inputs.

In the realm of real-time operating systems, deterministic execution is key, and an O(1) scheduler was able to provide scheduling services with a fixed upper-bound on execution times.

The O(1) scheduler was used in Linux releases 2.6.0 through 2.6.22 (2003-2007), at which point it was superseded by the Completely Fair Scheduler.

== Overview ==
The Linux scheduler was overhauled completely with the release of kernel 2.6 in 2003. The new scheduler was called the O(1) scheduler. The algorithm used by the O(1) scheduler relies on active and expired arrays of processes to achieve constant scheduling time. Each process is given a fixed time quantum, after which it is preempted and moved to the expired array. Once all the tasks from the active array have exhausted their time quantum and have been moved to the expired array, an array switch takes place. Because the arrays are accessed only via pointer, switching them is as fast as swapping two pointers. This switch makes the active array the new empty expired array, while the expired array becomes the active array.

== Improvement in Linux scheduler performance ==
The Linux 2.6.8.1 scheduler did not contain any algorithms that run in worse than O(1) time. That is, every part of the scheduler is guaranteed to execute within a certain constant amount of time regardless of how many tasks are on the system. This allows the Linux kernel to efficiently handle massive numbers of tasks without increasing overhead costs as the number of tasks grows. There are two key data structures in the Linux 2.6.8.1 scheduler that allow for it to perform its duties in O(1) time, and its design revolves around runqueues and priority arrays.

== Issues ==
The main issue with this algorithm is the complex heuristics used to mark a task as interactive or non-interactive. The algorithm tries to identify interactive processes by analyzing average sleep time (the amount of time the process spends waiting for input). Processes that sleep for long periods of time probably are waiting for user input, so the scheduler assumes they're interactive. The scheduler gives a priority bonus to interactive tasks (for better throughput) while penalizing non-interactive tasks by lowering their priorities. All the calculations to determine the interactivity of tasks were complex and subject to potential miscalculations, causing non-interactive behavior from an interactive process.

== Replacement ==
In 2.6.23 (October 2007), the Completely Fair Scheduler was introduced, replacing the O(1) Scheduler. According to Ingo Molnar, the author of the CFS, its core design can be summed up in single sentence: "CFS basically models an 'ideal, precise multitasking CPU' on real hardware."

== See also ==
- Time complexity
- Brain Fuck Scheduler (BFS) – a process scheduler designed for the Linux kernel in August 2009 as an alternative to CFS and the O(1) scheduler
