= Aging (scheduling) =

Scheduling technique

In computer science for Operating systems, aging (US English) or ageing is a scheduling technique used to avoid starvation. Fixed priority scheduling is a scheduling discipline, in which tasks queued for utilizing a system resource are assigned a priority each. A task with a high priority is allowed to access a specific system resource before a task with a lower priority is allowed to do the same. A disadvantage of this approach is that tasks assigned with a lower priority may be starved when a large number of high priority tasks are queued. Aging is used to gradually increase the priority of a task, based on its waiting time in the ready queue.

== Problem ==
In priority-based scheduling algorithms, a major problem is indefinite block, or starvation. A process that is ready to run but waiting for the CPU can be considered blocked. A priority scheduling algorithm can leave some low-priority processes waiting indefinitely. A steady stream of higher-priority processes can prevent a low-priority process from ever getting the CPU.

== Application ==
Aging is used to ensure that jobs with lower priority will eventually complete their execution. This technique can be used to reduce starvation of low priority tasks. There are many ways to implement aging, but all have the same principle that the priority of a process should increase as it waits in the ready queue. The increase in priority may or may not be equal to the waiting time of the process.

== Example ==
Suppose a system with priority range of 0–511. In this system, 0 means highest priority. Consider a process with priority 127. If we increase its priority by 1 every 15 minutes, then in less than 32 hours the process will age to 0 priority and get executed.
