= Fair-share scheduling =

Computer algorithm

Fair-share scheduling is a scheduling algorithm for computer operating systems in which the CPU usage is equally distributed among system users or groups, as opposed to equal distribution of resources among processes.

One common method of logically implementing the fair-share scheduling strategy is to recursively apply the round-robin scheduling strategy at each level of abstraction (processes, users, groups, etc.) The time quantum required by round-robin is arbitrary, as any equal division of time will produce the same results.

This was first developed by Judy Kay and Piers Lauder through their research at the University of Sydney in the 1980s.

== Examples ==
For example, if four users (A, B, C, D) are concurrently executing one process each, the scheduler will logically divide the available CPU cycles such that each user gets 25% of the whole (100% / 4 = 25%). If user B starts a second process, each user will still receive 25% of the total cycles, but each of user B's processes will now be attributed 12.5% of the total CPU cycles each, totalling user B's fair share of 25%. On the other hand, if a new user starts a process on the system, the scheduler will reapportion the available CPU cycles such that each user gets 20% of the whole (100% / 5 = 20%).

Another layer of abstraction allows us to partition users into groups, and apply the fair share algorithm to the groups as well. In this case, the available CPU cycles are divided first among the groups, then among the users within the groups, and then among the processes for that user. For example, if there are three groups (1,2,3) containing three, two, and four users respectively, the available CPU cycles will be distributed as follows:

Group	Group share	Number of users	Share per user
Group 1	33.3%	3	11.1%
Group 2	33.3%	2	16.7%
Group 3	33.3%	4	8.3%
Total	100%	9	
