= Maximum throughput scheduling =

Procedure for scheduling data packets in a packet switched best-effort network

Maximum throughput scheduling is a procedure for scheduling data packets in a packet-switched best-effort network, typically a wireless network, in view to maximize the total throughput of the network, or the system spectral efficiency in a wireless network. This is achieved by giving scheduling priority to the least "expensive" data flows in terms of consumed network resources per transferred amount of information.

In advanced packet radio systems, for example the HSDPA 3.5G cellular system, channel-dependent scheduling is used instead of FIFO queuing to take advantage of favourable channel conditions to make best use of available radio conditions. Maximum throughput scheduling may be tempting in this context, especially in simulations where throughput of various schemes are compared. However, maximum throughput scheduling is normally not desirable, and channel-dependent scheduling should be used with care, as we will see below.

== Cost function in wireless packet radio systems ==
=== Example 1: Link adaptation ===
In a wireless network with link adaptation, and without co-channel interference from nearby wireless networks, the bit rate depends heavily on the carrier to noise ratio (CNR), which depends on the attenuation on the link between the transmitter and receiver, i.e. the path loss. For maximum throughput scheduling, links that are affected by low attenuation should be considered as inexpensive, and should be given scheduling priority.

=== Example 2: Spread spectrum ===
In the uplink of a spread spectrum cellular system, the carrier-to-interference ratio (CIR) is held constant by the power control for all users. For a user that suffers from high path loss, the power control will cause high interference level to signals from other users. This will prevent other more efficient data flows, since there is a maximum allowed interference level in the cell, and reduce the throughput. Consequently, for maximum throughput scheduling, data flows that suffer from high path loss should be considered as the most expensive, also in this case.

=== Example 3: Dynamic channel allocation ===
In wireless network with fast dynamic channel allocation (DCA), on a packet-by-packet or slot-by-slot basis, a user that is situated in the overlap between the coverage areas of several base stations would cause, or would be affected by, interference to/from nearby cells. The DCA algorithm would prevent the nearby cells from using the same frequency channel simultaneously. The cost function would correspond to the number of blocked nearby base station sites.

== Comparison with other resource sharing policies ==
If there are large differences between the "cost" of each data flow, which is the case especially in wireless networking, resources may be assigned to only one or very few data flows per physical channel in the network. If there are many simultaneously active data flows, a majority of the data flows will have to wait until the most inexpensive flows have no more data to transfer, and will suffer from scheduling starvation.

A maximum throughput scheduling policy may be tempting since it would optimize the resource utilization in a given network, but it would not be likely to maximize profit for the network operator. The levels of customer satisfaction would remain low due to many customers experiencing long or permanent service outages.

Proportional fairness would result in lower throughput, but starvation would be avoided.

Max-min fairness would result in even lower throughput, but higher level of fairness, meaning that the service quality that each data flow achieves would be even more stable.

Unlike max-min fair scheduling based on the fair queuing or round robin algorithms, a maximum throughput scheduling algorithm relies on the calculation of a cost function, which in wireless networks may require fast and truthful measurement of the path loss. Proportional fairness based on weighted fair queuing also require measurement or calculation of the cost function.

== See also ==
- Fairness measure
- Radio resource management
