= Proportional fairness =

Proportional fairness may refer to:

- Proportional division - a division of a resource among $n$ partners such that each partner receives a part worth for him at least $1/n$ of the whole.
- Proportional-fair rule - a rule for selecting between alternatives. Aims to attain a balance between efficiency and fairness.
  - Proportional-fair scheduling - a network scheduling algorithm based on similar principles.
- Proportional representation in electoral systems.
