= Bottleneck (engineering) =

Phenomenon in engineering

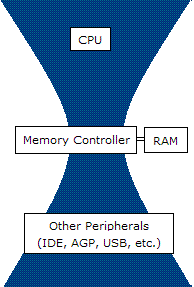
This graphic shows the bottleneck that can arise between the CPU, memory controller, and peripherals.

In engineering, a bottleneck is a phenomenon by which the performance or capacity of an entire system is severely limited by a single component. The component is sometimes called a bottleneck point. The term is metaphorically derived from the neck of a bottle, where the flow speed of the liquid is limited by its neck.

Formally, a bottleneck lies on a system's critical path and provides the lowest throughput. Bottlenecks are usually avoided by system designers, also a great amount of effort is directed at locating and tuning them. Bottleneck may be for example a processor, a communication link, a data processing software, etc.

== Bottlenecks in software ==
In computer programming, tracking down bottlenecks (sometimes known as "hot spots" - sections of the code that execute most frequently - i.e. have the highest execution count) is called performance analysis. Reduction is usually achieved with the help of specialized tools, known as performance analyzers or profilers. The objective being to make those particular sections of code perform as fast as possible to improve overall algorithmic efficiency.

== Bottlenecks in max-min fairness ==
In a communication network, sometimes a max-min fairness of the network is desired, usually opposed to the basic first-come first-served policy. With max-min fairness, data flow between any two nodes is maximized, but only at the cost of more or equally expensive data flows. To put it another way, in case of network congestion any data flow is only impacted by smaller or equal flows.

In such context, a bottleneck link for a given data flow is a link that is fully utilized (is saturated) and of all the flows sharing this link, the given data flow achieves maximum data rate network-wide. Note that this definition is substantially different from a common meaning of a bottleneck. Also note, that this definition does not forbid a single link to be a bottleneck for multiple flows.

A data rate allocation is max-min fair if and only if a data flow between any two nodes has at least one bottleneck link.

== See also ==
- Fairness measure
  - Max-min fairness
- Optimization (computer science)
- Performance engineering
- Profiling (computer programming)
- Route capacity
- Theory of constraints
