= Bottleneck (network) =

In a communication network, sometimes a max-min fairness of the network is desired, usually opposed to the basic first-come first-served policy. With max-min fairness, data flow between any two nodes is maximized, but only at the cost of more or equally expensive data flows. To put it another way, in case of network congestion any data flow is only impacted by smaller or equal flows.

In such context, a bottleneck link for a given data flow is a link that is fully utilized (is saturated) and of all the flows sharing this link, the given data flow achieves maximum data rate network-wide. Note that this definition is substantially different from a common meaning of a bottleneck. Also note, that this definition does not forbid a single link to be a bottleneck for multiple flows.

A data rate allocation is max-min fair if and only if a data flow between any two nodes has at least one bottleneck link. This concept is critical in understanding network efficiency and fairness, as it ensures that no single flow can monopolize network resources to the detriment of others.

Bottleneck links are significant in network design and management because they determine the maximum throughput of a network. Identifying and managing bottlenecks is crucial for maintaining optimal performance in networked systems. Strategies to mitigate the impact of bottleneck links include increasing the capacity of the bottleneck link, optimizing traffic management, and using load-balancing techniques to distribute data flows across multiple paths.

== See also ==
- Fairness measure
- Max-min fairness
