= Round-robin event =

Round-robin event may refer to:

- Round-robin tournament
- Round-robin scheduling
