= WRR =

WRR may refer to:

- Water Resources Research, a peer-reviewed scientific journal
- Watford and Rickmansworth Railway (W&RR), a company in England, 1860–1952
- Weighted round robin, a computer network scheduling algorithm
- Western Ring Route, a motorway system in Auckland, New Zealand
- Wetenschappelijke Raad voor het Regeringsbeleid, the Scientific Council for Government Policy, an advisory board to the Dutch government
- WRR (FM), a classical radio station in Dallas, Texas
- DWRR 101.9, a defunct radio station in the Philippines
- KTCK (AM), a radio station in Dallas, Texas which used the WRR call letters from 1921–1978
- World Rugby Rankings
