= Utilitarian rule =

Decision rule of maximizing utility

In social choice and operations research, the utilitarian rule (also called the max-sum rule) is a rule saying that, among all possible alternatives, society should pick the alternative which maximizes the sum of the utilities of all individuals in society. It is a formal mathematical representation of the utilitarian philosophy, and is often justified by reference to Harsanyi's utilitarian theorem or the Von Neumann–Morgenstern theorem.

== Definition ==
Let $X$ be a set of possible "states of the world" or "alternatives". Society wishes to choose a single state from $X$. For example, in a single-winner election, $X$ may represent the set of candidates; in a resource allocation setting, $X$ may represent all possible allocations of the resource.

Let $I$ be a finite set, representing a collection of individuals. For each $i \in I$, let $u_i:X\longrightarrow\mathbb{R}$ be a utility function, describing the amount of happiness an individual i derives from each possible state.

A social choice rule is a mechanism which uses the data $(u_i)_{i \in I}$ to select some element(s) from $X$ which are "best" for society (the question of what "best" means is the basic problem of social choice theory).

The utilitarian rule selects an element $x \in X$ which maximizes the utilitarian sum

$$U(x):= \sum_{i\in I} u_i(x).$$

== Tangible utility functions ==
The utilitarian rule is easy to interpret and implement when the functions u_{i} represent some tangible, measurable form of utility. For example:

- Consider a problem of allocating wood among builders. The utility functions may represent their productive power – $u_i(y_i)$ is the number of buildings that agent $i$ can build using $y_i$ units of wood. The utilitarian rule then allocates the wood in a way that maximizes the number of buildings.
- Consider a problem of allocating a rare medication among patients. The utility functions may represent their chance of recovery – $u_i(y_i)$ is the probability of agent $i$ to recover by getting $y_i$ doses of the medication. The utilitarian rule then allocates the medication in a way that maximizes the expected number of survivors.

== Abstract utility functions ==
When the functions u_{i} represent some abstract form of "happiness", the utilitarian rule becomes harder to interpret. For the above formula to make sense, it must be assumed that the utility functions $(u_i)_{i \in I}$ are both cardinal and interpersonally comparable at a cardinal level.

The notion that individuals have cardinal utility functions is not that problematic. Cardinal utility has been implicitly assumed in decision theory ever since Daniel Bernoulli's analysis of the St. Petersburg paradox. Rigorous mathematical theories of cardinal utility (with application to risky decision making) were developed by Frank P. Ramsey, Bruno de Finetti, von Neumann and Morgenstern, and Leonard Savage. However, in these theories, a person's utility function is only well-defined up to an "affine rescaling". Thus, if the utility function $u_i:X\longrightarrow \mathbb{R}$ is valid description of her preferences, and if $r_i,s_i\in \mathbb{R}$ are two constants with $s_i>0$, then the "rescaled" utility function $v_i(x) := s_i\, u_i(x) + r_i$ is an equally valid description of her preferences. If we define a new package of utility functions $(v_i)_{i\in I}$ using possibly different $r_i\in \mathbb{R}$ and $s_i>0$ for all $i \in I$, and we then consider the utilitarian sum

$$V(x):= \sum_{i\in I} v_i(x),$$

then in general, the maximizer of $V$ will not be the same as the maximizer of $U$. Thus, in a sense, classic utilitarian social choice is not well-defined within the standard model of cardinal utility used in decision theory, unless a mechanism is specified to "calibrate" the utility functions of the different individuals.

== Relative utilitarianism ==
Relative utilitarianism proposes a natural calibration mechanism. For every $i \in I$, suppose that the values

$$m_i \ := \ \min_{x \in X} \, u_i(x) \quad \text{and}\quad M_i \ := \ \max_{x \in X} \, u_i(x)$$

are well-defined. (For example, this will always be true if $X$ is finite, or if $X$ is a compact space and $u_i$ is a continuous function.) Then define

$$w_i(x) \ :=  \ \frac{u_i(x) - m_i}{M_i - m_i}$$

for all $x\in X$. Thus, $w_i:X \longrightarrow \mathbb{R}$ is a "rescaled" utility function which has a minimum value of 0 and a maximum value of 1. The Relative Utilitarian social choice rule selects the element in $X$ which maximizes the utilitarian sum

$$W(x):= \sum_{i\in I} w_i(x).$$

As an abstract social choice function, relative utilitarianism has been analyzed by Cao (1982), Dhillon (1998), Karni (1998), Dhillon and Mertens (1999), Segal (2000), Sobel (2001) and Pivato (2008). (Cao (1982) refers to it as the "modified Thomson solution".)

== The utilitarian rule and Pareto-efficiency ==
Every Pareto efficient social choice function is necessarily a utilitarian choice function, a result known as Harsanyi's utilitarian theorem. Specifically, any Pareto efficient social choice function must be a linear combination of the utility functions of each individual utility function (with strictly positive weights).

== The utilitarian rule in specific contexts ==
In the context of voting, the utilitarian rule leads to several voting methods:

- Range voting (also called score voting or utilitarian voting) implements the relative-utilitarian rule by letting voters explicitly express their utilities to each alternative on a common normalized scale.
- Implicit utilitarian voting tries to approximate the utilitarian rule while letting the voters express only ordinal rankings over candidates.

In the context of resource allocation, the utilitarian rule leads to:

- A particular rule for division of a single homogeneous resource;
- Several rules and algorithms for utilitarian cake-cutting – dividing a heterogeneous resource;
- A particular rule for fair item allocation.
- Welfare maximization problem.
- Utilitarian stable matching

== See also ==
- Egalitarian rule
- Proportional-fair rule
- Utility maximization problem
