= Fair division of a single homogeneous resource =

Fair division of a single homogeneous resource is one of the simplest settings in fair division problems. There is a single resource that should be divided between several people. The challenge is that each person derives a different utility from each amount of the resource. Hence, there are several conflicting principles for deciding how the resource should be divided. A primary conflict is between efficiency and equality. Efficiency is represented by the utilitarian rule, which maximizes the sum of utilities; equality is represented by the egalitarian rule, which maximizes the minimum utility.

== Setting ==
In a certain society, there are:

- $t$ units of some divisible resource.
- $n$ agents with different "utilities".
- The utility of agent $i$ is represented by a function $u_i$; when agent $i$ receives $y_i$ units of resource, he derives from it a utility of $u_i(y_i)$.

This setting can have various interpretations. For example:

- The resource is wood, the agents are builders, and the utility functions represent their productive power - $u_i(y_i)$ is the number of buildings that agent $i$ can build using $y_i$ units of wood.
- The resource is a medication, the agents are patients, and the utility functions represent their chance of recovery - $u_i(y_i)$ is the probability of agent $i$ to recover by getting $y_i$ doses of the medication.

In any case, the society has to decide how to divide the resource among the agents: it has to find a vector $y_1,\dots,y_n$ such that: $y_1+\cdots+y_n = t$

== Allocation rules ==
=== Envy-free ===
The Envy-freeness rule says that the resource should be allocated such that no agent envies another agent. In the case of a single homogeneous resource, it always selects the allocation that gives each agent the same amount of the resource, regardless of their utility function:

$$\forall i: y_i = t/n$$

=== Utilitarian ===
The utilitarian rule says that the sum of utilities should be maximized. Therefore, the utilitarian allocation is:

$$y = \arg\max_y \sum_i u_i(y_i)$$

=== Egalitarian ===
The egalitarian rule says that the utilities of all agents should be equal. Therefore, we would like to select an allocation that satisfies:

$$\forall i,j: u_i(y_i) = u_j(y_j)$$

However, such allocation may not exist, since the ranges of the utility functions might not overlap (see example below). To ensure that a solution exists, we allow different utility levels, but require that agents with utility levels above the minimum receive no resources:

$$y_i>0 \implies u_i(y_i) = \min_j u_j(y_j)$$

Equivalently, the egalitarian allocation maximizes the minimum utility:

$$y = \arg\max_y \min_i u_i(y_i)$$

The utilitarian and egalitarian rules may lead to the same allocation or to different allocations, depending on the utility functions. Some examples are illustrated below.

== Examples ==
=== Common utility and unequal endowments ===
Suppose all agents have the same utility function, $u$, but each agent $i$ has a different initial endowment, $x_i$. So the utility of each agent $i$ is given by:

$$u_i(y_i) = u(x_i + y_i)$$

If $u$ is a concave function, representing diminishing returns, then the utilitarian and egalitarian allocations are the same - trying to equalize the endowments of the agents. For example, if there are 3 agents with initial endowments $x=2,4,9$ and the total amount is $t=8$, then both rules recommend the allocation $y=5,3,0$, since it both pushes towards equal utilities (as much as possible) and maximizes the sum of utilities.

In contrast, if $u$ is a convex function, representing increasing returns, then the egalitarian allocation still pushes towards equality, but the utilitarian allocation now gives all the endowment to the richest agent: $y=0,0,9$. This makes sense, for example, when the resource is a scarce medication: it may be socially best to give all medication to the patient with the highest chances of curing.

=== Constant utility ratios ===
Suppose there is a common utility function $u$, but each agent has a different coefficient $a_i$ representing this agent's productivity. So the utility of each agent $i$ is given by:

$$u_i(y_i) = a_i\cdot u(y_i)$$

Here, the utilitarian and egalitarian approaches are diametrically opposed.

- The egalitarian allocation gives more resources to the less productive agents, in order to compensate them and let them reach a high utility level:
  $$a_i>a_j \implies y_j>y_i$$
- The utilitarian allocation gives more resources to the more productive agents, since they will use the resources better:
  $$a_i>a_j \implies y_i>y_j$$

== Properties of allocation rules ==
- Resource-monotonicity: the envy-free rule and the egalitarian rule are always resource-monotonic. The utilitarian rule is resource-monotonic when all utility functions are concave functions, representing diminishing returns; but, when some utility functions are convex functions, representing increasing returns, the utilitarian rule might be not resource-monotonic.

== See also ==
- Utilitarianism
- Egalitarianism
