= Egalitarian rule =

Rawlsian decision rule for social choice

In social choice and operations research, the egalitarian rule (also called the max-min rule or the Rawlsian rule) is a rule saying that, among all possible alternatives, society should pick the alternative which maximizes the minimum utility of all individuals in society. It is a formal mathematical representation of the egalitarian philosophy. It also corresponds to John Rawls' principle of maximizing the welfare of the worst-off individual.

== Definition ==
Let $X$ be a set of possible `states of the world' or `alternatives'. Society wishes to choose a single state from $X$. For example, in a single-winner election, $X$ may represent the set of candidates; in a resource allocation setting, $X$ may represent all possible allocations.

Let $I$ be a finite set, representing a collection of individuals. For each $i \in I$, let $u_i:X\longrightarrow\mathbb{R}$ be a utility function, describing the amount of happiness an individual i derives from each possible state.

A social choice rule is a mechanism which uses the data $(u_i)_{i \in I}$ to select some element(s) from $X$ which are `best' for society. The question of what 'best' means is the basic question of social choice theory. The egalitarian rule selects an element $x \in X$ which maximizes the minimum utility, that is, it solves the following optimization problem:

$\max_{x\in X} \min_{i\in I} u_i(x).$

=== Leximin rule ===
Often, there are many different states with the same minimum utility. For example, a state with utility profile (0,100,100) has the same minimum value as a state with utility profile (0,0,0). In this case, the egalitarian rule often uses the leximin order, that is: subject to maximizing the smallest utility, it aims to maximize the next-smallest utility; subject to that, maximize the next-smallest utility, and so on.

For example, suppose there are two individuals - Alice and George, and three possible states: state x gives a utility of 2 to Alice and 4 to George; state y gives a utility of 9 to Alice and 1 to George; and state z gives a utility of 1 to Alice and 8 to George. Then state x is leximin-optimal, since its utility profile is (2,4) which is leximin-larger than that of y (9,1) and z (1,8).

The egalitarian rule strengthened with the leximin order is often called the leximin rule, to distinguish it from the simpler max-min rule.

The leximin rule for social choice was introduced by Amartya Sen in 1970, and discussed in depth in many later books.

== Properties ==
=== Conditions for Pareto efficiency ===
The leximin rule is Pareto-efficient if the outcomes of every decision are known with certainty. However, by Harsanyi's utilitarian theorem, any leximin function is Pareto-inefficient for a society that must make tradeoffs under uncertainty: There exist situations in which every person in a society would be better-off (ex ante) if they were to take a particular bet, but the leximin rule will reject it (because some person might be made worse off ex post).

=== Pigou-Dalton property ===
The leximin rule satisfies the Pigou–Dalton principle, that is: if utility is "moved" from an agent with more utility to an agent with less utility, and as a result, the utility-difference between them becomes smaller, then resulting alternative is preferred.

Moreover, the leximin rule is the only social-welfare ordering rule which simultaneously satisfies the following three properties:

1. Pareto efficiency;
2. Pigou-Dalton principle;
3. Independence of common utility pace - if all utilities are transformed by a common monotonically-increasing function, then the ordering of the alternatives remains the same.

== Egalitarian resource allocation ==
The egalitarian rule is particularly useful as a rule for fair division. In this setting, the set $X$ represents all possible allocations, and the goal is to find an allocation which maximizes the minimum utility, or the leximin vector. This rule has been studied in several contexts:

- Division of a single homogeneous resource;
- Fair subset sum problem;
- Egalitarian cake-cutting;
- Egalitarian item allocation;
- Egalitarian (leximin) bargaining;
- Leximin rule for cake sharing.

== See also ==
- Utilitarian rule - a different rule that emphasizes the sum of utilities rather than the smallest utility.
- Proportional-fair rule - a different rule that emphasizes the product of utilities rather than the smallest utility.
- Max-min fair scheduling - max-min fairness in process scheduling.
- Regret (decision theory)
- Wald's maximin model
