= Round-robin =

Round-robin may refer to:

== Computing ==
- Round-robin DNS, a technique for dealing with redundant Internet Protocol service hosts
- Round-robin networks, communications networks made up of radio nodes organized in a mesh topology
- Round-robin scheduling, an algorithm for assigning equal time-slices to different processes on a computer
- Round-robin item allocation, an algorithm for fairly allocating indivisible objects among people

== Communication ==
- Round robin, a document signed by several parties in a circle
- Round-robin letter, a news-filled letter typically accompanying a Christmas card
- Round-Robin Letter, a letter written in the United States Army during the Spanish–American War in 1898

== Other uses ==
- Round-robin story, a collaborative piece of fiction or storytelling
- Round-robin test, an interlaboratory test performed independently several times
- Round-robin tournament, a competition where each contestant meets all other contestants in turn
- Round-robin start, a possible ordering of turns in a turn-based game
- Round-robin bet, a type of wager offered by UK bookmakers, covering three selections
- "Round Robin", a 1960 song by Donnie Brooks

== See also ==
- RRDtool, a round-robin database tool
- Modular arithmetic, a system of arithmetic for integers, where numbers "wrap around" upon reaching a certain value
