= George Varghese =

American computer scientist

George Varghese (born 1960) is a computer scientist, a professor of computer science and Jonathan B. Postel Chair in Networking in the UCLA Henry Samueli School of Engineering and Applied Science. He is the author of the textbook Network Algorithmics, published by Morgan Kaufmann in 2004.

== Education and career ==
Varghese received his B.Tech in electrical engineering from IIT Bombay in 1981, his M.S. in computer studies from NCSU in 1983 and his Ph.D. in computer science from MIT in 1993, where his advisor was Nancy Lynch. He has been a Fellow of the ACM since 2002.

Varghese was a professor at Washington University in St. Louis from 1992 until 1999, when he moved to the University of California, San Diego. He worked at Microsoft Research from 2012 until 2016, and took his present position at the University of California, Los Angeles in 2016.

== Research ==
=== Transparent Bridge Architecture ===
Before his Ph.D., George spent several years as part of the network architecture and advanced development group at Digital Equipment Corporation, where he wrote the first specification for the first transparent bridge architecture (based on the inventions of Mark Kempf and Radia Perlman). After several iterations and other authors, this became the IEEE 802 bridge specification, a widely implemented standard that is the basis of the billion dollar transparent bridging industry{{According to whom}}. He was also part of the DEC team that invented the Gigaswitch and the Giganet (a precursor to Gigabit Ethernet).

=== Network Algorithmics ===
Varghese is known for helping define network algorithmics, a field of study which resolves networking bottlenecks using interdisciplinary techniques that include changes to hardware and operating systems as well as efficient algorithms.

His contributions to network algorithmics include Deficit Round Robin (co-invented with M. Shreedhar), a scheduling algorithm that is widely used in routers, and timing wheels (with Tony Lauck), an algorithm for fast timers that is used as the basis of fast timers in Linux and FreeBSD.

=== IP lookup and packet classification ===
Varghese has also worked extensively on fast IP lookup and packet classification. His work with G. Chandranmenon on Threaded indexes predates the work done at Cisco Systems and Juniper Networks on tag switching. His work on multibit tries (with V. Srinivasan) has been used by a number of companies including Microsoft. His work on scalable IP packet lookup (with Waldvogel and Turner) for longer addresses such as IPv6 is being considered for use by Linux.

George also worked with Will Eatherton and Zubin Dittia on the Tree Bitmap IP lookup algorithm that is used in Cisco's CRS-1 router. When announced in May 2004, Guinness World Records certified the CRS-1 as having the highest capacity of any Internet router at 92 terabits per second. The router’s design and scalability were later discussed in networking research analyzing the efficiency of large routing tables.

=== Self stabilization ===
George is also known for his contributions to the theoretical field of self-stabilization (a form of fault-tolerance), where he has helped (with various colleagues) pioneer several general techniques such as local checking, local correction, and counter flushing.

== NetSift ==
Varghese co-founded NetSift Inc. (with Sumeet Singh) in 2004, serving as president and CTO. NetSift helped pioneer the notion of automated signature extraction for security and helped to introduce the use of streaming algorithms for network measurement and security at speeds greater than 10 Gbit/s. His work with Cristian Estan on multistage filters has been widely used in industry. NetSift was acquired in June 2005 by Cisco Systems as part of the Modular Switching Group.

== Awards and honors ==
- Elected as a member into the National Academy of Engineering, 2017
- 2014 Koji Kobayashi Award for Computers and Communications for "Contributions to the field of network algorithmics and its applications to high-speed packet networks"
- ACM Fellow, 2002
- Best Teacher Award in Computer Science, UCSD, 2001, voted by graduating undergraduate students
- Best Tutorial Award, SIGMETRICS 98.
- Big Fish, Mentor of the Year Award, Association for Graduate Engineering Students (AGES), Washington University 1997.
- ONR Young Investigator Award 1996 (34 awarded out of 416 applications across the sciences, among 2 computer scientists chosen in 1996)
- Best Student Paper, PODC 96, for a paper jointly written with student Mahesh Jayaram.
- Joint winner of the Sproull Prize for best MIT Thesis in Computer Science (1993) and nominated by MIT for ACM Thesis Prize.
- DEC Graduate Education Program (GEEP) Scholar, 1989–1991.

== Selected publications ==
- Sumeet Singh, Cristian Estan, George Varghese, and Stefan Savage, Automated Worm Fingerprinting, Proceedings of the 6th ACM/USENIX Symposium on Operating Systems Design and Implementation (OSDI). This paper was the basis of NetSift, which see above.
- Cristian Estan, David Moore, and George Varghese, Building a Better NetFlow, Proceedings of the ACM SIGCOMM Conference, Portland, OR, September 2004
- Fan Chung Graham, Ron Graham, and George Varghese, Parallelism versus Memory Allocation in Pipelined Router Forwarding Engines
- Proceedings of SPAA 2004 (invited and accepted to Theory of Computer Science journal as best of SPAA), Barcelona, Spain March 2004
- W. Eatherton, Z. Dittia, and George Varghese, Tree bitmap: Hardware Software IP Lookups with Incremental Updates (no prior conference paper, IP lookup algorithm used in Cisco's most recent CRS-1 router) ACM Computer Communications Review, volume 34, April 2004
- George Varghese, Summary of Ph.D. Thesis on Self-stabilization
