= Deficit round robin =

Scheduling algorithm for the network scheduler

Deficit round robin (DRR), also deficit-weighted round robin (DWRR), is a scheduling algorithm for the network scheduler. DRR is, similar to weighted fair queueing (WFQ), a packet-based implementation of the ideal generalized processor sharing (GPS) policy. It was proposed by M. Shreedhar and G. Varghese in 1995 as an efficient (with O(1) complexity) and fair algorithm.

== Details ==
In DRR, a scheduler handling N flows (Note: Flows may also be called queues, classes or sessions) is configured with one quantum $Q_i$ for each flow. This global idea is that, at each round, the flow $i$ can send at most $Q_i$ bytes, and the remaining, if any, is reported to the next round. In this way, the minimum rate that flow $i$ will achieve over the long term is $\frac{Q_i}{(Q_1+Q_2+...+Q_N)}R$; where $R$ is the link rate.

== Algorithm ==
The DRR scans all non-empty queues in sequence. When a non-empty queue $i$ is selected, its deficit counter is incremented by its quantum value. Then, the value of the deficit counter is a maximal number of bytes that can be sent at this turn: if the deficit counter is greater than the packet's size at the head of the queue (HoQ), this packet can be sent, and the value of the counter is decremented by the packet size. Then, the size of the next packet is compared to the counter value, etc. Once the queue is empty or the value of the counter is insufficient, the scheduler will skip to the next queue. If the queue is empty, the value of the deficit counter is reset to 0.

Variables and Constants
    const integer N             // Nb of queues
    const integer Q[1..N]       // Per queue quantum 
    integer DC[1..N]            // Per queue deficit counter
    queue queue[1..N]           // The queues

Scheduling Loop
while true do
    for i in 1..N do
        if not queue[i].empty() then
            DC[i]:= DC[i] + Q[i]
            while( not queue[i].empty() and
                         DC[i] ≥ queue[i].head().size() ) do
                DC[i] := DC[i] − queue[i].head().size()
                send( queue[i].head() )
                queue[i].dequeue()
            end while 
            if queue[i].empty() then
                DC[i] := 0
            end if
        end if
    end for
end while

== Performances: fairness, complexity, and latency ==
Like other GPS-like scheduling algorithms, the choice of the weights is left to the network administrator.

Like WFQ, DRR offers a minimal rate to each flow, regardless of the size of the packets. In weighted round robin scheduling, the fraction of bandwidth used depends on packet sizes.

Compared with WFQ scheduler that has complexity of O(log(n)) (n is the number of active flows/queues), the complexity of DRR is O(1), if the quantum $Q_i$ is larger than the maximum packet size of this flow. Nevertheless, this efficiency has a cost: the latency, i.e., the distance to the ideal GPS, is larger in DRR than in WFQ. More on the worst-case latencies can be found here.

== Implementations ==
An implementation of the deficit round-robin algorithm was written by Patrick McHardy for the Linux kernel and published under the GNU General Public License.

In Cisco and Juniper routers, modified versions of DRR are implemented: since the latency of DRR can be larger for some class of traffic, these modified versions give higher priority to some queues, whereas the others are served with the standard DRR algorithm.

== See also ==
- Weighted round robin
- Fairness measure
