= Best-effort delivery =

Communications with no quality of service guarantee

Best-effort delivery describes a network service in which a network does not provide any guarantee that data is effectively delivered or that delivery meets any quality of service. In a best-effort network, all users obtain best-effort service. Under best-effort, network performance characteristics such as transmission speed, network delay and packet loss depend on the current network traffic load, and the network hardware capacity. When network load increases, this can lead to packet loss, retransmission, packet delay variation, further network delay, or even timeout and session disconnect.

Best-effort can be contrasted with reliable delivery, which can be built on top of best-effort delivery (possibly without latency and throughput guarantees), or with virtual circuit schemes which can maintain a predefined quality of service.

There are aspects of network neutrality and fair use.

== Network examples ==
=== Physical services ===
The postal service (snail mail) physically delivers letters using a best-effort delivery approach. The delivery of a certain letter is not scheduled in advance – no resources are preallocated in the post offices. The service will make their "best effort" to try to deliver a message, but the delivery may be delayed if too many letters suddenly arrive at a postal office or triage center. The sender is generally not informed when a letter has been delivered successfully, unless one pays for this premium service. When the addressee is unknown the message might be returned to sender. Or the letter might be definitively lost or destroyed without notification.

Conventional telephone networks are not based on best-effort communication, but on circuit switching. During the connection phase of a new call, resources are proactively reserved in the telephone exchanges along the path, or a busy signal informs the user that the call failed due to a lack of capacity. An ongoing phone call can never be interrupted due to overloading of the network, and is guaranteed constant bandwidth (both of which are not guaranteed in a mobile telephone network).

=== Internet ===
The Internet Protocol offers a best-effort service for delivering datagrams between hosts. IPv4 and IPv6 is an internet protocol that depends on the best-effort delivery approach. Datagrams may be lost, arbitrarily delayed, corrupted, or duplicated. The User datagram protocol (UDP) provides a simple layer which only error-checks the datagrams. Transmission control protocol (TCP) provides a guaranteed delivery of an octet stream between two processes on a pair of hosts to the above layer, internally splitting the stream into packets and individually resending these when lost or corrupted. The applications built on top of those protocols implement the additional services they require on an end-to-end basis. Both transport-layers are the base protocols and provide multiplexing between processes on the same host running over different port numbers.

=== Ethernet ===
Ethernet is an industry standard of best-effort for local networks, while Synchronous Ethernet allows for guaranteed delivery for high speed connections.
