= Transmission time =

Time it takes a transmitter to send message

In telecommunication networks, the transmission time is the amount of time from the beginning until the end of a message transmission. In the case of a digital message, it is the time from the first bit until the last bit of a message has left the transmitting node. The packet transmission time in seconds can be obtained from the packet size in bit and the bit rate in bit/s as:

Packet transmission time = Packet size / Bit rate

Example: Assuming 100 Mbit/s Ethernet, and the maximum packet size of 1526 bytes, results in

Maximum packet transmission time = 1526×8 bit / (100 × 10^{6} bit/s) ≈ 122 μs

== Propagation delay ==
The transmission time should not be confused with the propagation delay, which is the time it takes for the first bit to travel from the sender to the receiver (During this time the receiver is unaware that a message is being transmitted). The propagation speed depends on the physical medium of the link (that is, fiber optics, twisted-pair copper wire, etc.) and is in the range of $2\times10^8$ meters/sec for copper wires and $3\times10^8$ for wireless communication, which is equal to the speed of light. The ratio of actual propagation speed to the speed of light is also called the velocity factor of the medium. The propagation delay of a physical link can be calculated by dividing the distance (the length of the medium) in meter by its propagation speed in m/s.

Propagation time = Distance / propagation speed

Example: Ethernet communication over a UTP copper cable with maximum distance of 100 meter between computer and switching node results in:

Maximum link propagation delay ≈ 100 m / (200 000 000 m/s) = 0.5 μs

== Packet delivery time ==
The packet delivery time or latency is the time from when the first bit leaves the transmitter until the last is received. In the case of a physical link, it can be expressed as:

Packet delivery time = Transmission time + Propagation delay

In case of a network connection mediated by several physical links and forwarding nodes, the network delivery time depends on the sum of the delivery times of each link, and also on the packet queuing time (which is varying and depends on the traffic load from other connections) and the processing delay of the forwarding nodes. In wide-area networks, the delivery time is in the order of milliseconds.

== Roundtrip time ==
The round-trip time or ping time is the time from the start of the transmission from the sending node until a response (for example an ACK packet or ping ICMP response) is received at the same node. It is affected by packet delivery time as well as the data processing delay, which depends on the load on the responding node. If the sent data packet as well as the response packet have the same length, the roundtrip time can be expressed as:

Roundtrip time = 2 × Packet delivery time + processing delay

In case of only one physical link, the above expression corresponds to:

Link roundtrip time = 2 × packet transmission time + 2 × propagation delay + processing delay

If the response packet is very short, the link roundtrip time can be expressed as close to:

Link roundtrip time ≈ packet transmission time + 2 × propagation delay + processing delay

== Throughput ==
The network throughput of a connection with flow control, for example a TCP connection, with a certain window size (buffer size), can be expressed as:

Network throughput ≈ Window size / roundtrip time

In case of only one physical link between the sending and transmitting nodes, this corresponds to:

Link throughput ≈ Bitrate × Transmission time / roundtrip time

The message delivery time or latency over a network depends on the message size in bit, and the network throughput or effective data rate in bit/s, as:

Message delivery time = Message size / Network throughput

== See also ==
- Minimum-Pairs Protocol
- End-to-end delay
