= High-throughput =

High-throughput may refer to:

- High-throughput computing, a computer science concept
- High-throughput screening, a bioinformatics concept
- High-throughput biology, a cell biology concept
- High-throughput sequencing, DNA sequencing
- Measuring data throughput, a communications concept

== See also ==
- Throughput
