= Network throughput =

Rate at which data is processed in communication networks

Network throughput (or just throughput, when in context) refers to the rate of message delivery over a communication channel in a communication network, such as Ethernet or packet radio. The data that these messages contain may be delivered over physical or logical links, or through network nodes. Throughput is usually measured in bits per second (bit/s, sometimes abbreviated bps), and sometimes in packets per second (p/s or pps) or data packets per time slot.

The aggregate throughput is the sum of the data rates that are delivered over all channels in a network. Throughput represents digital bandwidth consumption. Bandwidth is the maximum achievable speed or capacity. Throughput is the actual speed or capacity achieved and is always less than bandwidth.

The throughput of a communication system may be affected by various factors, including the limitations of the underlying physical medium, available processing power of the system components, end-user behavior, etc. When taking various protocol overheads into account, the useful rate of the data transfer can be significantly lower than the maximum achievable throughput; the useful part is usually referred to as goodput.

== Maximum throughput ==
Maximum throughput is the highest data rate a system can deliver. It is the number most often used to compare how well different systems can perform, and it is often used when talking about end-user throughput tests. It means roughly the same as digital bandwidth capacity.

Four values are used to compare the upper limit of what different systems can do: maximum theoretical throughput, maximum achievable throughput, peak measured throughput and maximum sustained throughput. These values represent different qualities, and care must be taken that the same definitions are used when comparing different maximum throughput values.

Each bit must carry the same amount of information if throughput values are to be compared. Data compression can significantly alter throughput calculations, including generating values exceeding 100% in some cases.

If the communication is mediated by several links in series with different bit rates, the maximum throughput of the overall link is lower than or equal to the lowest bit rate. The lowest value link in the series is referred to as the bottleneck.

=== Maximum theoretical throughput ===
Maximum theoretical throughput is closely related to the channel capacity of the system, and is the maximum possible quantity of data that can be transmitted under ideal circumstances. In some cases, this number is reported as equal to the channel capacity, though this can be deceptive, as only non-packetized systems technologies can achieve this. Maximum theoretical throughput is more accurately reported taking into account format and specification overhead with best-case assumptions.

=== Asymptotic throughput ===
The asymptotic throughput (less formal asymptotic bandwidth) for a packet-mode communication network is the value of the maximum throughput function, when the incoming network load approaches infinity, either due to a message size, or the number of data sources. As with other bit rates and data bandwidths, the asymptotic throughput is measured in bits per second (bit/s) or (rarely) bytes per second (B/s), where 1 B/s is 8 bit/s. Decimal prefixes are used, meaning that 1 Mbit/s is 1000000 bit/s.

Asymptotic throughput is usually estimated by sending or simulating a very large message (sequence of data packets) through the network, using a greedy source and no flow control mechanism (i.e., UDP rather than TCP), and measuring the volume of data received at the destination node. Traffic load between other sources may reduce this maximum network path throughput. Alternatively, a large number of sources and sinks may be modeled, with or without flow control, and the aggregate maximum network throughput measured (the sum of traffic reaching its destinations). In a network simulation model with infinitely large packet queues, the asymptotic throughput occurs when the network latency (due to packet queuing time) goes to infinity, while if the packet queues are limited, or the network is a multi-drop network with many sources, and collisions may occur, the packet-dropping rate approaches 100%.

A well-known application of asymptotic throughput is in modeling point-to-point communication where message latency $T(N)$ is modeled as a function of message length $N$ as $T(N) = (M + N)/A$ where $A$ is the asymptotic bandwidth and $M$ is the half-peak length.

As well as its use in general network modeling, asymptotic throughput is used in modeling performance on massively parallel computer systems, where system operation is highly dependent on communication overhead, as well as processor performance. In these applications, asymptotic throughput is used modeling which includes the number of processors, so that both the latency and the asymptotic throughput are functions of the number of processors.

=== Peak measured throughput ===
Where asymptotic throughput is a theoretical or calculated capacity, peak measured throughput is throughput measured on a real implemented system, or on a simulated system. The value is the throughput measured over a short period of time; mathematically, this is the limit taken with respect to throughput as time approaches zero. This term is synonymous with instantaneous throughput. This number is useful for systems that rely on burst data transmission; however, for systems with a high duty cycle, this is less likely to be a useful measure of system performance.

=== Maximum sustained throughput ===
Maximum sustained throughput is the throughput averaged or integrated over a long time. For networks under constant load, this is likely to be the most accurate indicator of system performance. The maximum throughput is defined as the asymptotic throughput when the load is large. In packet-switched networks while packet loss is not occurring, the load and the throughput always are equal. The maximum throughput may be defined as the minimum load in bit/s that causes packet loss or causes the latency to become unstable and increase towards infinity.

== Channel utilization and efficiency ==
Throughput is sometimes normalized and measured in percentage, but normalization may cause confusion regarding what the percentage is related to. Channel utilization, channel efficiency and packet drop rate in percentage are less ambiguous terms.

The channel efficiency, also known as bandwidth utilization efficiency, is the percentage of the net bit rate (in bit/s) of a digital communication channel that goes to the achieved throughput. For example, if the throughput is 70 Mbit/s over a 100 Mbit/s Ethernet connection, the channel efficiency is 70%.

Channel utilization includes both the data bits and the transmission overhead in the channel. The transmission overhead consists of preamble sequences, frame headers and acknowledgment packets. In a simplistic approach, channel efficiency can be equal to channel utilization assuming that acknowledge packets are zero-length and that the communications provider will not see any bandwidth relative to retransmissions or headers. Therefore, certain texts mark a difference between channel utilization and protocol efficiency.

In a point-to-point or point-to-multipoint communication link, where only one terminal is transmitting, the maximum throughput is often equivalent to or very near the physical data rate (the channel capacity), since the channel utilization can be almost 100% in such a network, except for a small inter-frame gap.

For example, the maximum frame size in Ethernet is 1526 bytes: up to 1500 bytes for the payload, eight bytes for the preamble, 14 bytes for the header, and 4 bytes for the trailer. An additional minimum interframe gap corresponding to 12 bytes is inserted after each frame. This corresponds to a maximum channel utilization of 1526 / (1526 + 12) × 100% = 99.22%, or a maximum channel use of 99.22 Mbit/s inclusive of Ethernet datalink layer protocol overhead over a 100 Mbit/s Ethernet connection. The maximum throughput or channel efficiency is then 1500 / (1526 + 12) = 97.5%, exclusive of the Ethernet protocol overhead.

== Standardized metrics ==
The Internet Engineering Task Force (IETF) has defined several of these terms. RFC 5136 separates a link's nominal physical capacity, the most data it could carry at the physical layer in theory, from its IP-layer capacity, which counts only the bits from the start of the IP header to the end of the IP packet's payload. A link's available capacity is the part of its IP-layer capacity that is not already in use. A path's available capacity is the lowest available capacity among its links, and that link is often called the tight link.

For TCP, RFC 3148 defines bulk transfer capacity as the data rate a single ideal TCP connection is expected to average over a path in the long run. RFC 6349 describes how to test TCP throughput on managed networks, such as business services with a service-level agreement. It uses three measures: how long a transfer took compared with the ideal time (the TCP transfer time ratio), the share of data that did not need to be resent (TCP efficiency), and how much the round-trip time grew during the test (the buffer delay percentage).

== Factors affecting throughput ==
The throughput of a communication system will be limited by a number of factors. Some of these are described below.

=== Analog limitations ===
The maximum achievable throughput (the channel capacity) is affected by the bandwidth in hertz and signal-to-noise ratio of the analog physical medium. Limited current drive capability in communications equipment can limit the effective signal-to-noise ratio for high capacitance links.

Despite the conceptual simplicity of digital information, all electrical signals traveling over wires are analog. The analog limitations of wires or wireless systems inevitably provide an upper bound on the amount of information that can be sent. The dominant equation here is the Shannon–Hartley theorem, and analog limitations of this type can be understood as factors that affect either the analog bandwidth of a signal or as factors that affect the signal-to-noise ratio. The bandwidth of twisted pair cabling used by Ethernet is limited to approximately 1 GHz, and PCB traces are limited by a similar amount.

Digital systems refer to the knee frequency, the amount of time for the digital voltage to rise from 10% of a nominal digital 0 to a nominal digital 1 or vice versa. The knee frequency is related to the bandwidth of a channel, and can be related to the 3 db bandwidth of a system by the equation: $\ F_{3dB} \approx K/T_r$ Where Tr is the 10% to 90% rise time, and K is a constant of proportionality related to the pulse shape, equal to 0.35 for an exponential rise, and 0.338 for a Gaussian rise.

Other analog factors include:

- RC losses: Wires have an inherent resistance, and an inherent capacitance when measured with respect to ground. This causes all wires and cables to act as RC lowpass filters.
- Skin effect: As frequency increases, electric charges migrate to the edges of wires or cable. This reduces the effective cross-sectional area available for carrying current, increasing resistance and reducing the signal-to-noise ratio. For AWG 24 wire (of the type commonly found in Cat 5e cable), the skin effect frequency becomes dominant over the inherent resistivity of the wire at 100 kHz. At 1 GHz the resistivity has increased to 0.1 ohm per inch.
- Termination and ringing: Wires longer than about 1/6 wavelengths must be modeled as transmission lines and termination must be taken into account. Without termination, reflected signals will travel back and forth across the wire, interfering with the information-carrying signal.
- Wireless channel effects: For wireless systems, all of the effects associated with wireless transmission limit the SNR and bandwidth of the received signal, and therefore the maximum transmission rate.

=== Hardware and protocol considerations ===
Large data loads that require processing impose data processing requirements on hardware. For example, a gateway router must examine and perform routing table lookups on billions of packets per second.

CSMA/CD and CSMA/CA backoff waiting time and frame retransmissions after detected collisions slows transmissions. This may occur in Ethernet bus networks and hub networks, as well as in wireless networks.

Flow control, for example, in the Transmission Control Protocol (TCP) protocol, affects the throughput if the bandwidth-delay product is larger than the TCP window. In that case, the sending computer must wait for acknowledgement of the data packets before it can send more packets.

TCP congestion avoidance controls the data rate. A so-called slow start occurs in the beginning of a file transfer, and after packet drops caused by router congestion or bit errors in, for example, wireless links.

=== Multi-user considerations ===
Ensuring that multiple users can harmoniously share a single communications link requires some kind of equitable sharing of the link. If a communication link offering data rate R is shared by N active users, ideally, every user can typically achieve a throughput of approximately R/N.

Network schedulers in routers and switches ultimately determine how bandwidth is shared. If fair queuing is not provided, users that send large packets will get higher bandwidth. Some users may be prioritized in a weighted fair queuing (WFQ) algorithm if differentiated or guaranteed quality of service (QoS) is provided.

In some communications systems, such as satellite networks, only a finite number of channels may be available to a given user at a given time. Channels are assigned either through preassignment or through Demand Assigned Multiple Access (DAMA). In these cases, throughput is quantized per channel, and unused capacity on partially utilized channels is lost.

== Goodput and overhead ==
The maximum throughput is often an unreliable measurement of effective bandwidth, for example the file transmission data rate in bits per seconds. The achieved throughput is often lower than the maximum throughput. Protocol overhead affects the effective bandwidth.

In schemes that include forward error correction codes, the redundant error code is normally excluded from the throughput. An example in modem communication, where the throughput is typically measured in the interface between the Point-to-Point Protocol (PPP) and the circuit-switched modem connection. In this case, the maximum throughput is often called net bit rate or useful bit rate.

To determine the actual data rate of a network or connection, the goodput measurement definition may be used. For example, in file transmission, the goodput corresponds to the file size (in bits) divided by the file transmission time. The goodput is the amount of useful information that is delivered per second to the application layer protocol. Dropped packets or packet retransmissions, as well as protocol overhead, are excluded. Because of that, the goodput is lower than the maximum throughput.

== Other uses ==
=== Integrated circuits ===
Often, a block in a data-flow diagram has a single input and a single output, and operates on discrete packets of information. Examples of such blocks are fast Fourier transform modules or binary multipliers. Because the units of throughput (e.g., messages per second) are the reciprocal of the unit for propagation delay (e.g., seconds per message), throughput can be used to relate a computational block to a communications channel, simplifying system analysis.

=== Wireless and cellular networks ===
In wireless networks or cellular systems, the system spectral efficiency in bit/s/Hz/area, bit/s/Hz/site or bit/s/Hz/cell units, is the maximum aggregate throughput divided by the analog bandwidth and some measure of the system coverage area.

=== Over analog channels ===
Throughput over analog channels is determined by the modulation scheme, the signal-to-noise ratio, and the available bandwidth. Since throughput is normally defined in terms of quantified digital data, the term throughput is not normally used; the term bandwidth is more often used instead.

== See also ==
- BWPing
- High-throughput computing (HTC)
- Iperf
- Network traffic measurement
- Performance engineering
- Traffic generation model
- ttcp
