= Greedy source =

A greedy source is a traffic generator in a communication network that generates data at the maximum rate possible and at the earliest opportunity possible. Each source always has data to transmit, and is never in idle state due to congestion avoidance or other local host traffic shaping. One new data-packet is generated when the transmission of previous packet is completed, meaning that the sender side queue is never congested. A greedy session is a time-limited packet flow or data stream at maximum possible rate.

A greedy source traffic generation simulation model, or a greedy traffic generator, is useful when simulating and analysing or measuring the maximum throughput of a network.

== See also ==
- Best-effort delivery
- Measuring network throughput
- Teletraffic engineering
- Traffic generation model
