= Netperf =

Software application

- Original author: Rick Jones
- Developers: HP Networking Performance Team and others
- Stable release: 2.7.0 / July 20, 2015; 11 years ago
- Written in: C
- Operating system: Cross-platform
- Type: Bandwidth management
- License: MIT
- Website: hewlettpackard.github.io/netperf/
- Repository: github.com/HewlettPackard/netperf

Netperf is a software application that provides network bandwidth testing between two hosts on a network. It supports Unix domain sockets, TCP, SCTP, DLPI and UDP via BSD Sockets. Netperf provides a number of predefined tests e.g. to measure bulk (unidirectional) data transfer or request response performance.

A particular feature of Netperf is that it runs each test multiple times and reports not only the results but also reports the Confidence Interval. It can test both TCP and UDP. It was written in C and works on most UNIX variants, including BSD, System V, Linux, and MacOS.

Netperf was originally developed by Rick Jones at Hewlett Packard in Cupertino, California, USA.

== See also ==
- Flowgrind
- Iperf
- NetPIPE
- Nuttcp
- bwping
- Measuring network throughput
- Packet generation model
