= NetPIPE =

- Developer: Scalable Computing Lab - Ames Laboratory
- Stable release: 5.1.4 / April 12, 2019
- Written in: C
- Operating system: Unix
- Type: Bandwidth management
- License: GPL
- Website: netpipe.cs.ksu.edu
- Repository: gitlab.beocat.ksu.edu/daveturner/netpipe-5.x

NetPIPE (Network Protocol-Independent Performance Evaluater) is a protocol independent performance tool that visually represents the network performance under a variety of conditions. It has modules for PVM, TCGMSG, and the 1-sided message-passing standards of MPI-2 and SHMEM.

== See also ==
- Flowgrind
- Iperf
- Netperf
- Nuttcp
- bwping
