= Traffic generation model =

A traffic generation model is a stochastic model of the traffic flows or data sources in a communication network, for example a cellular network or a computer network. A packet generation model is a traffic generation model of the packet flows or data sources in a packet-switched network. For example, a web traffic model is a model of the data that is sent or received by a user's web-browser. These models are useful during the development of telecommunication technologies, in view to analyse the performance and capacity of various protocols, algorithms and network topologies .

== Application ==
The network performance can be analyzed by network traffic measurement in a testbed network, using a network traffic generator such as Flowgrind, Iperf, NetPerfMeter, Netperf, Nuttcp, Ttcp, bwping, and Mausezahn. The traffic generator sends dummy packets, often with a unique packet identifier, making it possible to keep track of the packet delivery in the network.

Numerical analysis using network simulation is often a less expensive approach.

An analytical approach using queueing theory may be possible for a simplified traffic model but is often too complicated if a realistic traffic model is used.

== The greedy source model ==
A simplified packet data model is the greedy source model. It may be useful in analyzing the maximum throughput for best-effort traffic (without any quality-of-service guarantees). Many traffic generators are greedy sources.

== Poisson traffic model ==
Another simplified traditional traffic generation model for packet data, is the Poisson process, where the number of incoming packets and/or the packet lengths are modeled as an exponential distribution. When the packets interarrival time is exponential, with constant packet size it resembles an M/D/1 system. When both packet inter arrivals and sizes are exponential, it is an M/M/1 queue.

== Long-tail traffic models ==
However, the Poisson traffic model is memoryless, which means that it does not reflect the bursty nature of packet data, also known as the long-range dependency. For a more realistic model, a self-similar process such as the Pareto distribution can be used as a long-tail traffic model.

== Payload data model ==
The actual content of the payload data is typically not modeled, but replaced by dummy packets. However, if the payload data is to be analyzed on the receiver side, for example regarding bit-error rate, a Bernoulli process is often assumed, i.e. a random sequence of independent binary numbers. In this case, a channel model reflects channel impairments such as noise, interference and distortion.

=== 3GPP2 model ===
One of the 3GPP2 models is described in. This document describes the following types of traffic flows:

- Downlink:
  - HTTP/TCP
  - FTP/TCP
  - Wireless Application Protocol
  - near real-time Video
  - Voice
- Uplink:
  - HTTP/TCP
  - FTP/TCP
  - Wireless Application Protocol
  - Voice
  - Mobile Network Gaming

The main idea is to partly implement HTTP, FTP and TCP protocols. For example, an HTTP traffic generator simulates the download of a web-page, consisting of a number of small objects (like images). A TCP stream (that's why TCP generator is a must in this model) is used to download these objects according to HTTP1.0 or HTTP1.1 specifications. These models take into account the details of these protocols' work. The Voice, WAP and Mobile Network Gaming are modelled in a less complicated way.

== See also ==
- Channel model
- Measuring network throughput
- Mobility model
- Network emulation
- Network traffic simulation
- Network simulation
- Radio propagation model
- Queueing theory
- Packet generator
- Packet sniffer
