= Network model (disambiguation) =

The network model is a database model.

Network model may also refer to:

- Network topology
- Packet generation model
- Channel model

== See also ==
- OSI reference model for networks
