= Traffic generation =

"Traffic generation" can refer to:

- Induced demand, the phenomenon that after supply increases, more of a good is consumed, when applied to automobile traffic
- Traffic generation model, a model of the traffic flows or data sources in a communication network
