= GloMoSim =

Global Mobile Information System Simulator (GloMoSim) is a network protocol simulation software that simulates wireless and wired network systems.

GloMoSim is designed using the parallel discrete event simulation capability provided by Parsec, a parallel programming language. GloMoSim currently supports protocols for a purely wireless network.

It uses the Parsec compiler to compile the simulation protocols.

== Parsec ==
Parsec is a C-based simulation language, developed by the Parallel Computing Laboratory at UCLA, for sequential and parallel execution of discrete-event simulation models.

== Development ==
GloMoSim is no longer under active development
