= Speedof.me =

Internet speed test service

SpeedOf.Me
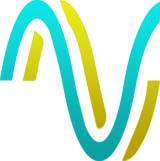
- Website type: Internet speed test
- Available in: English, Arabic, French, German, Italian, Persian, Spanish
- Website: speedof.me
- Commercial: Yes
- Launched: December 1, 2011; 14 years ago
- Current status: Active

SpeedOf.Me is a browser-based internet speed test service launched in 2011. It measures download and upload speed, latency and jitter without a plug-in or app, and is financed through advertising and a paid API that lets other websites and applications embed the test. Technology publications use it when testing VPN services, California's broadband grant guidelines list it as an example of a commercial speed test, and its measurement method has been analyzed in academic research. In 2026 it began publishing a country ranking of median download speeds.

== Features ==
SpeedOf.Me reports download and upload throughput, latency (ping) and jitter, and runs in the web browser without a plug-in or app. It uses servers around the world, selecting one automatically based on the user's location. Rather than transferring data all at once, it downloads and uploads a series of progressively larger sample files in sequence, an approach the service says approximates real-world web browsing. A live graph shows the connection speed as the test runs. Results can be saved to a local history and shared as an image link.

== API ==
The service offers a JavaScript API that lets third-party websites and applications embed its speed test, and in January 2026 it released @speedofme/mcp, a Node.js package that includes a Model Context Protocol (MCP) server through which AI agents can run speed tests.

== Speed data ==
In July 2026 the company published the Internet Speed Atlas, a ranking of 119 countries by median download speed, based on browser speed tests from the first half of 2026.

== Use ==
Some technology publications list it among the speed tests used when they review VPN services. California's broadband grant guidelines name it as an example of a commercial speed test applicants can use to show actual speeds, and it is one of the speed test platforms supported by a National Science Foundation-funded broadband measurement toolkit at the University of California, San Diego. A 2021 academic study of web-based speed tests analyzed its measurement method.
