= Iperf =

Network performance software tool

iperf2
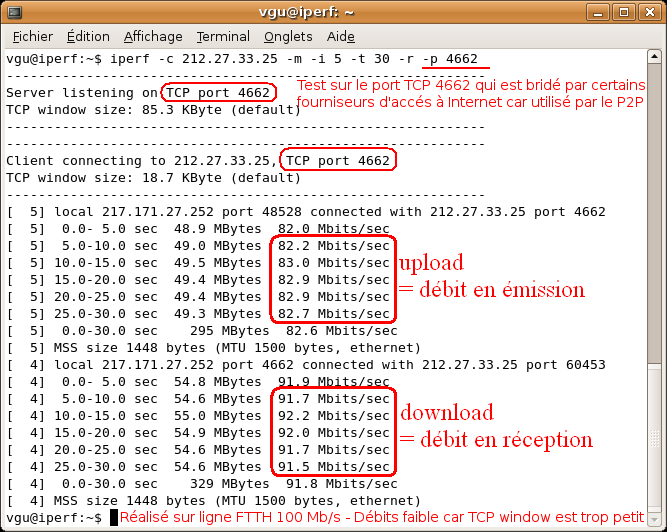
- Description of Iperf on TCP port 4662 under linux with an FTTH connection
- Original authors: Mark Gates, Alex Warshavsky
- Developers: Robert McMahon, Tim Auckland
- Stable release: 2.2.1 / November 6, 2024
- Written in: C
- Operating system: Cross-platform
- License: BSD license
- Website: sf.net/projects/iperf2/
- Repository: sf.net/p/iperf2/code/

iperf3
- Original author: ESnet
- Stable release: 3.21 / April 9, 2026
- Written in: C
- Operating system: Cross-platform
- License: BSD license
- Website: software.es.net/iperf/
- Repository: github.com/esnet/iperf

iperf, also known as Iperf or iPerf, is a tool for network performance measurement and tuning. It is a cross-platform tool that can produce standardized performance measurements for any network. iperf has client and server functionality, and can create data streams to measure the throughput between the two ends in one or both directions. Typical iperf output contains a time-stamped report of the amount of data transferred and the throughput measured.

The data streams can be either Transmission Control Protocol (TCP) or User Datagram Protocol (UDP):

- UDP: When used for testing UDP capacity, iperf allows the user to specify the datagram size and provides results for the datagram throughput and the packet loss.
- TCP: When used for testing TCP capacity, iperf measures the throughput of the payload. iperf uses 1024 × 1024 for mebibytes and 1000 × 1000 for megabytes.

iperf is open-source software written in C, and it runs on various platforms, including Linux, Unix and Windows (either natively or inside Cygwin). The availability of the source code enables the user to scrutinize the measurement methodology.

iperf is a compatible reimplementation of the ttcp program that was developed at the National Center for Supercomputing Applications at the University of Illinois by the Distributed Applications Support Team (DAST) of the National Laboratory for Applied Network Research (NLANR), which was shut down on December 31, 2006, on termination of funding by the United States National Science Foundation.

== iperf3 ==
iperf3 is a rewrite of iperf from scratch to create a smaller, simpler code base. iperf3 was started in 2009, with the first release in January 2014. iperf3 is not backwards compatible with iperf2. iperf3 also includes a library version which enables other programs to use the provided functionality. Versions of iperf3 prior to 3.16 were single-threaded, which limited their performance to the speed of a single CPU core. Subsequent releases use one thread per TCP connection / UDP stream, which greatly increases the possible throughput when using multiple parallel connections.

Officially iperf3 supports only Linux, FreeBSD, and macOS. A user of Neowin, BudMan, provides unofficial Windows builds on his server.

Most current Linux distributions have iperf3 in their native package repositories. Unix packages are available from Oracle for Solaris 11.4.

== See also ==
- Flowgrind
- NetPIPE
- Netperf
- Nuttcp
- bwping
- Measuring network throughput
- Packet generation model
