= Bandwidth allocation protocol =

The Bandwidth Allocation Protocol, along with its control protocol, the Bandwidth Allocation Control Protocol, is used to add and remove links in a multilink bundle over PPP, and specifying which peer is responsible for making decisions regarding bandwidth management. The protocol was originally conceived by Craig Richards and Kevin Smith of Shiva Corporation and Ascend Communications respectively in 1997 and has since been implemented on a number of routers, including in Cisco IOS.
