= End-to-end delay =

Time taken for a packet to travel across a network from source to destination

End-to-end delay or one-way delay (OWD) refers to the time taken for a packet to be transmitted across a network from source to destination. It is a common term in IP network monitoring, and differs from round-trip time (RTT) in that only the path in one direction, from source to destination, is measured.

== Measurement ==
The ping utility measures the RTT, that is, the time to go and come back to a host. Half the RTT is often used as an approximation of OWD but this assumes that the forward and back paths are the same in terms of congestion, number of hops, or quality of service (QoS). This is not always a good assumption. To avoid such problems, the OWD may be measured directly.

=== Direct ===
OWDs may be measured between two points A and B of an IP network through the use of synchronized clocks; A records a timestamp on the packet and sends it to B, which notes the receiving time and calculates the OWD as their difference. The transmitted packets need to be identified at the source and destination in order to avoid packet loss or packet reordering. However, this method suffers from several limitations, such as requiring intensive cooperation between both parties, and the accuracy of the measured delay is subject to the synchronization precision.

The Minimum-Pairs Protocol is an example by which several cooperating entities, A, B, and C, could measure OWDs between one of them and a fourth less cooperative one (e.g., between B and X).

=== Estimate ===
Transmission between two network nodes may be asymmetric, and the forward and reverse delays are not equal. Half the RTT value is the average of the forward and reverse delays and so may sometimes be used as an approximation to the end-to-end delay. The accuracy of such an estimate depends on the nature of the delay distribution in both directions. As delays in both directions become more symmetric, the accuracy increases.

The probability mass function (PMF) of absolute error, E, between the smaller of the forward and reverse OWDs and their average (i.e., RTT/2) can be expressed as a function of the network delay distribution as follows:

$$\Pr(E = x) = \begin{cases}\displaystyle\sum_{i=0}^\infty f_i(a).f_i(b), &x=0,\\\displaystyle\sum_{i=0}^\infty f_i(a).f_{2x+i}(b) + \sum_{i=0}^\infty f_i(b).f_{2x+i}(a), &x>0,\end{cases}$$

where a and b are the forward and reverse edges, and f_{y}(z) is the PMF of delay of edge z (that is, f_{y}(z) = Pr{delay on edge z = y}).

== Delay components ==
End-to-end delay in networks comes from several sources including transmission delay, propagation delay, processing delay and queuing delay.

== See also ==
- Age of Information
- Minimum-Pairs Protocol
- Network delay
- Store and forward
