= Network traffic measurement =

In computer networks, network traffic measurement is the process of measuring the amount and type of traffic on a particular network. This is especially important with regard to effective bandwidth management.

== Techniques ==
Network performance could be measured using either active or passive techniques. Active techniques (e.g. Iperf) are more intrusive but are arguably more accurate. Passive techniques have less network overhead and hence can run in the background to be used to trigger network management actions.

== Measurement studies ==
A range of studies have been performed from various points on the Internet. The AMS-IX (Amsterdam Internet Exchange) is one of the world's largest Internet exchanges. It produces a constant supply of simple Internet statistics. There are also numerous academic studies that have produced a range of measurement studies on frame size distributions, TCP/UDP ratios and TCP/IP options.

== Tools ==
Various software tools are available to measure network traffic. Some tools measure traffic by sniffing and others use SNMP, WMI or other local agents to measure bandwidth use on individual machines and routers. However, the latter generally do not detect the type of traffic, nor do they work for machines which are not running the necessary agent software, such as rogue machines on the network, or machines for which no compatible agent is available. In the latter case, inline appliances are preferred. These would generally 'sit' between the LAN and the LAN's exit point, generally the WAN or Internet router, and all packets leaving and entering the network would go through them. In most cases the appliance would operate as a bridge on the network so that it is undetectable by users.

Some tools used for SNMP monitoring are Tivoli Netcool/Proviso by IBM, CA Performance Management by CA Technologies., and SolarWinds

=== Functions and features ===
Measurement tools generally have these functions and features:

- User interface (web, graphical, console)
- Real-time traffic graphs
- Network activity is often reported against pre-configured traffic matching rules to show:
  - Local IP address
  - Remote IP address
  - Port number or protocol
  - Logged in user name
- Bandwidth quotas
- Support for traffic shaping or rate limiting (overlapping with the network traffic control page)
- Support website blocking and content filtering
- Alarms to notify the administrator of excessive usage (by IP address or in total)

== See also ==
- IP Flow Information Export and NetFlow
- Measuring network throughput
- Network management
- Network monitoring
- Network scheduler
- Network simulation
- Packet sniffer
- Performance management
- Token bucket
