= Scan tool =

Automotive tool for interfacing with vehicle control modules

An automotive scan tool (scanner) is an electronic tool used to interface with, diagnose and, sometimes, reprogram vehicle control modules.

There are many types from just as many manufacturers, one of the most familiar being the Snap-On Inc. "brick", or MT2500/MTG2500. Snap-On, Hella Gutmann Solutions, OTC/SPX, XTool india, Autel, Launch, Vetronix/Bosch and a number of other companies produce various types of scan tools, from simple code readers to highly capable bi-directional computers with programming capabilities.

The scan tool is connected to the vehicle's data link connector (DLC) and, depending on the particular tool, may only read out diagnostic trouble codes or DTC's (this would be considered a "code reader") or may have more capabilities. Actual scan tools will display live data stream (inputs and outputs), have bi-directional controls (the ability to make the controllers do things outside of normal operations) and may even be able to calibrate/program modules within certain parameters. However, a typical scan tool does not have the ability to fully reprogram modules because it requires a J-2534 pass-through device and specific software.

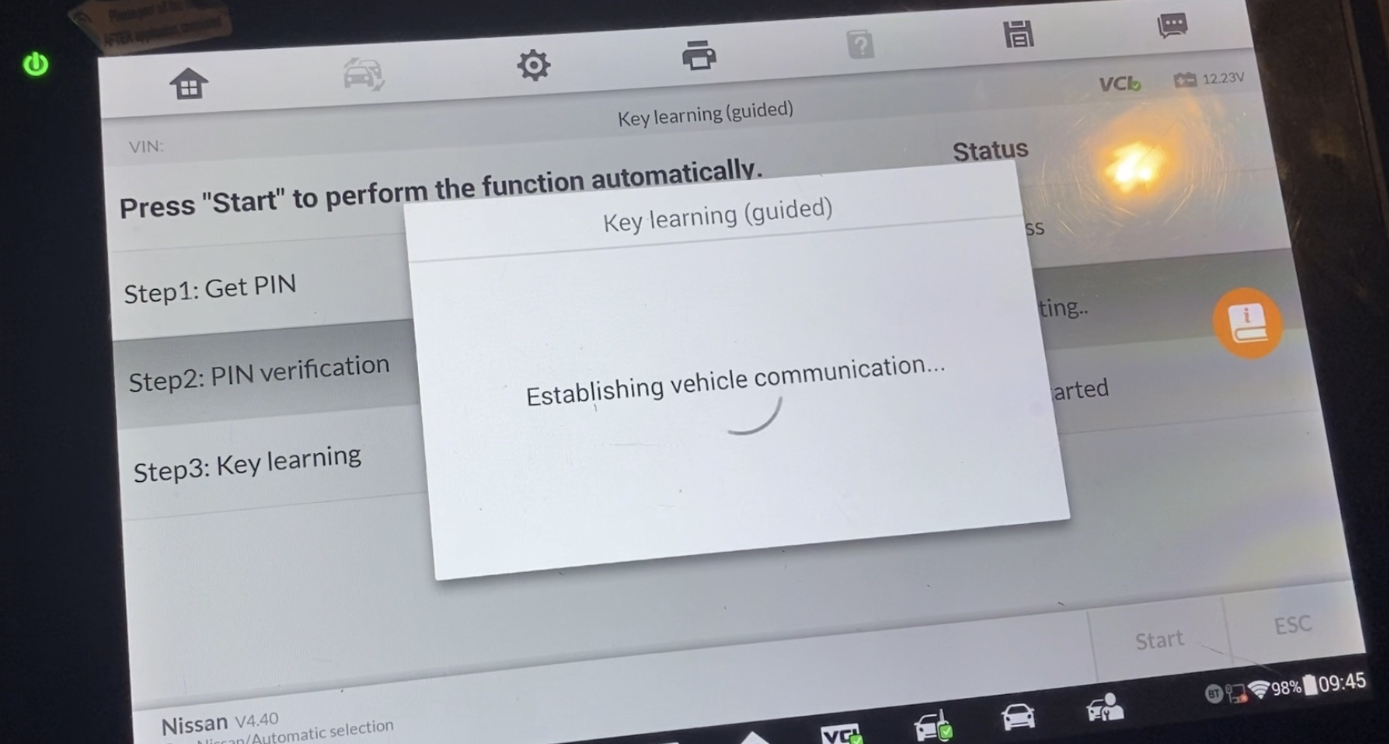
Autel IM608 in process of programming a key

OBD 1 vs OBD 2 the vehicle will also dictate what the scan tool is able to display. If the vehicle is equipped with OBD 1 it will have significantly less available data when compared to a vehicle equipped with OBD 2.

When a vehicle detects a problem, it generates a DTC code which is a unique code that corresponds to the specific problem detected. The code is usually a combination of letters and numbers.

DTC codes are read by a diagnostic tool, such as an OBD 2 scanner, which is plugged into the vehicle's diagnostic port. The tool communicates with the vehicle's onboard computer and retrieves the DTC codes. The codes are then interpreted by the mechanic or technician to determine the specific problem with the vehicle.

== See also ==
- OBD-II PIDs list of data readable with a scan tool
- ELM327 very common integrated circuit inside scan tools
- OBDuino onboard computer made with Arduino that has the scan tool functions
- Data link connector (automotive) standard connector for OBD
- On-board diagnostics#OBD-II last specification for OBD
- Pass through device (automotive)
