= Check engine light =

Type of indicator light in automobiles

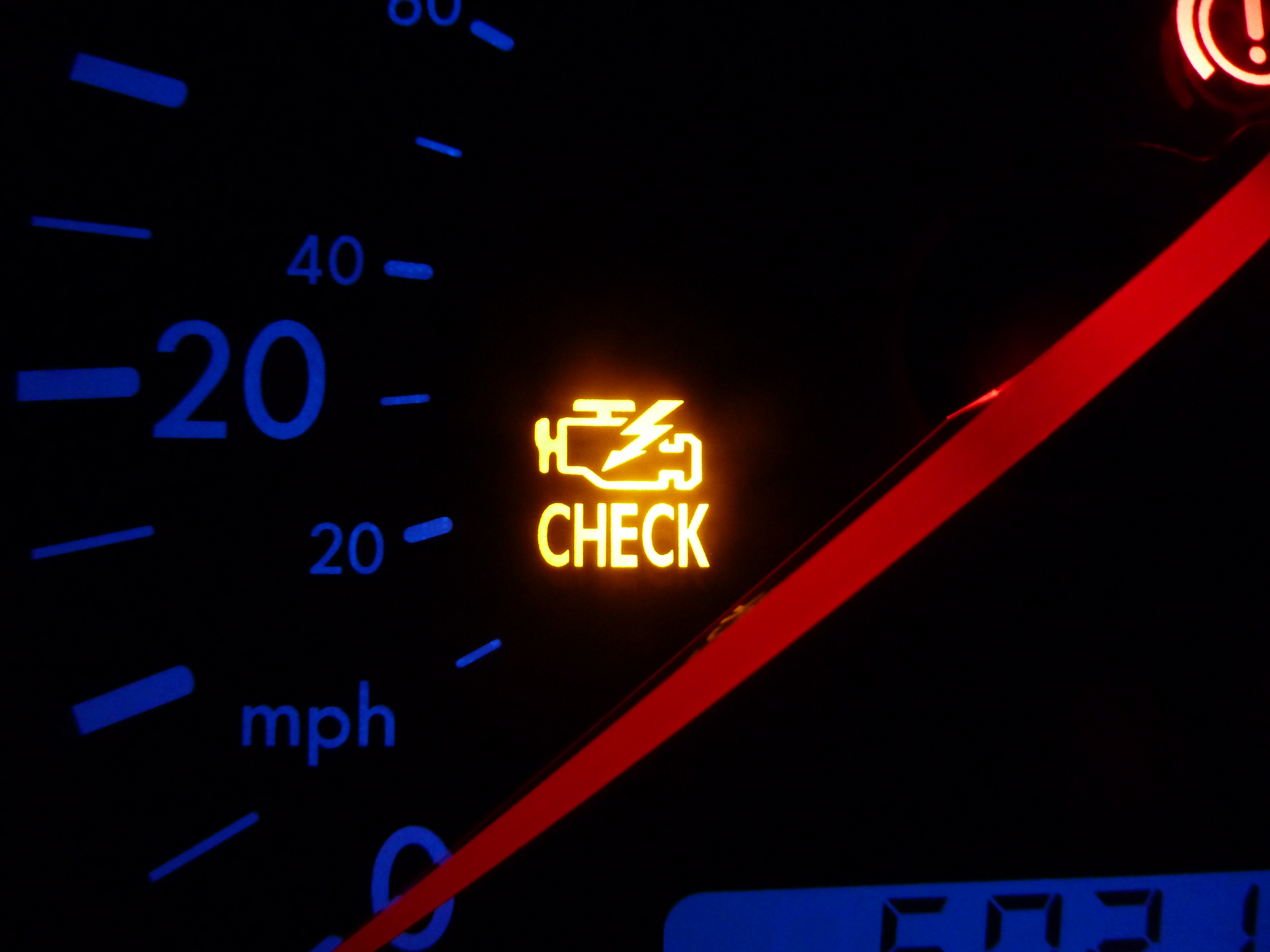
A check engine light on a Volkswagen Bora indicating a fault in the engine management system

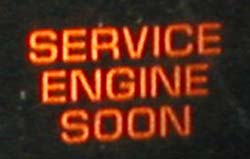
A check engine light labeled "service engine soon"

Check engine icon, also known as the malfunction indicator icon

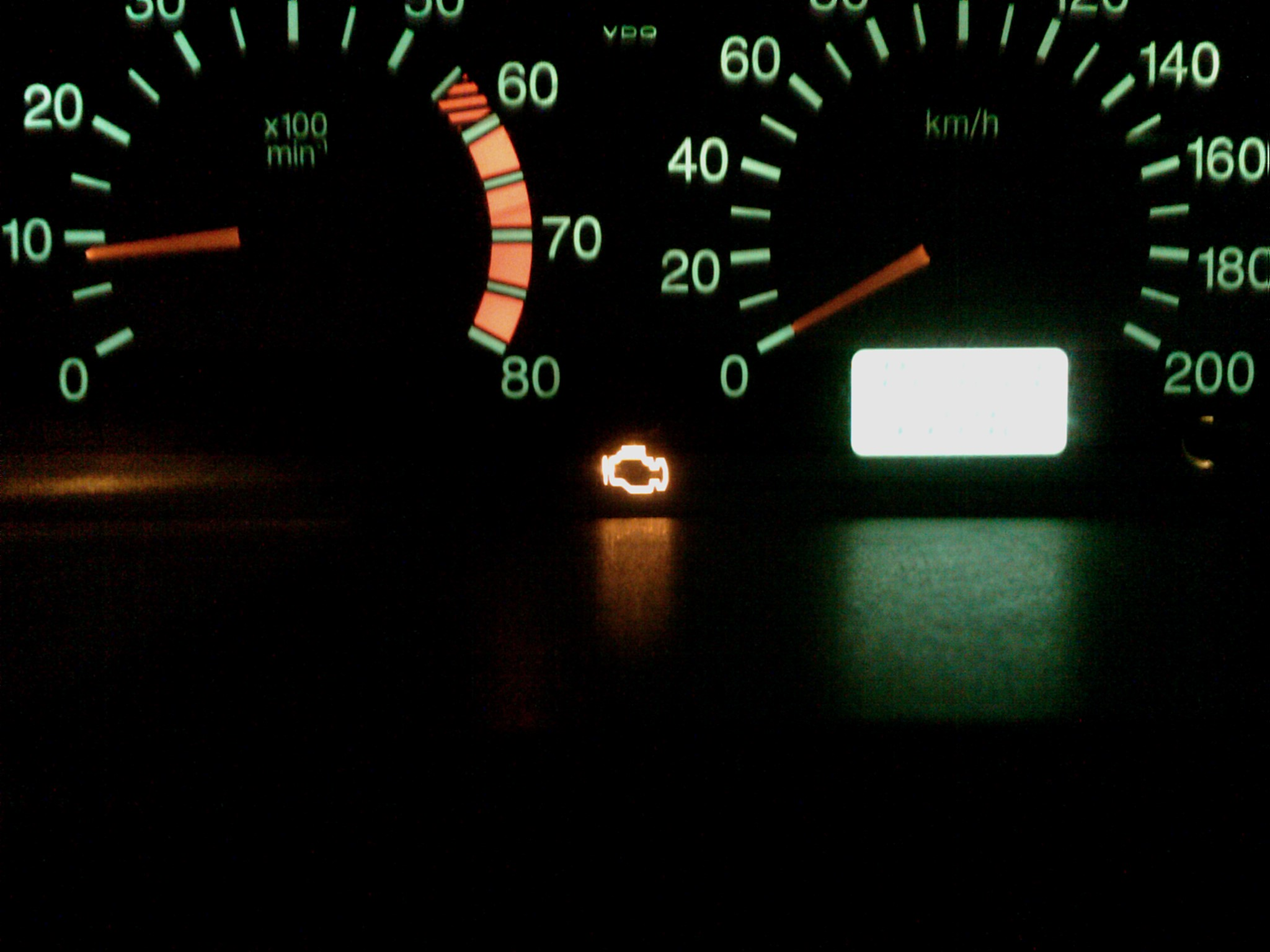
Check engine light on a running engine indicating malfunction in engine control system

A check engine light or malfunction indicator light (MIL) or lamp, is a tell-tale that a computerized engine-management system uses to indicate a malfunction or problem with the vehicle ranging from minor (such as a loose gas cap) to serious (worn spark plugs, engine problems or a faulty oil valve, etc.). Found on the instrument panel of most automobiles, it usually bears the legend engine, (Note: 1980s and 1990s Ford F-Series trucks had an optional redundant engine light, a second engine light alongside the check engine light, which would only light under severe conditions. As the name suggests, its purpose was redundancy in case the primary check engine light failed.) check engine, service engine soon, maintenance required, emiss maint, or a pictogram of an engine—and when illuminated, it is typically an amber or red color.

The light generally (Note: On vehicles equipped with OBD-II) has two stages: steady (indicating a minor repairable fault, but service on the vehicle is strongly recommended as soon as possible to prevent future damage) and flashing (indicating a severe fault and an emergency that makes the vehicle unsafe to drive and it is strongly recommended that the vehicle gets mechanical attention straight away). When the check engine light is lit, the engine control unit stores a fault code related to the malfunction, which can be retrieved—which usually requires the use of a scan tool. This warning light can indicate almost anything from a loose gas cap to a serious knock or fault in the engine.

In the United States, specific functions are required of the check engine light by EPA regulations.

== History ==
Some older vehicles had a single indicator labeled "trouble" or "engine"; this was not a check engine light, but a tell-tale meant to indicate serious trouble with the engine (low oil pressure, overheating, or charging system problems) and an imminent breakdown. This usage of the "engine" light was discontinued in the mid-1980s, to prevent confusion with the check engine light.

The check engine light appeared in the early 80s along with computerized engine controls. Even the earliest systems, such as General Motors' CCC (computer command control) system had self diagnosis functionality. When the computer detected a fault, it illuminated the check engine light. Up until OBDII, on most cars the check engine light could output codes. When two pins on the ALDL are jumped, the light would flash the codes, for instance (blink) (pause) (blink) (blink) for code 12. Some manufacturers, such as Honda, retained this feature even after OBDII.

The check engine light is commonly referred to today as the "check engine light" or the "service engine soon light".

== See also ==
- OBD-II PIDs – Codes used for on-board diagnostics
