= General Motors Local Area Network =

General Motors Local Area Network (GMLAN) is an application- and transport-layer protocol using controller area network for lower layer services. It was standardized as SAE J2411 for use in OBD-II vehicle networks.

== Transport-layer services ==
Transport-layer services include the transmission of multi-CAN-frame messages based on the ISO 15765-2 multi-frame messaging scheme. It was developed and is used primarily by General Motors for in-vehicle communication and diagnostics. GM's Tech2 uses the CANdi (Controller Area Network diagnostic interface) adapter to communicate over GMLAN.

== Applications ==
Some software applications that allow interfacing to GMLAN are Intrepid Control Systems, Inc.'s Vehicle Spy 3; Vector's CANoe; Dearborn Group's Hercules, ETAS' ES-1222, ES590, ES715, and ES580; ScanTool.net's OBDLink MX; EControls by Enovation Controls' CANCapture; and GMLAN vehicle universal remote control GMRC for Android devices

Tesla uses J2411 (single-wire CAN over the Control Pilot) for their DC Supercharger (newer units are also capable of PLC over the control pilot) and AC Destination Charging.
