= Passthrough =

Passthrough (or pass-through) may refer to:

- Passthrough (electronics), a device used to pass an unmodified signal
  - Analog passthrough
  - Pass through device (automotive)
  - Passthrough, a term used to describe the use of cameras with head-up displays to render augmented reality objects in front of a user's vision
- Passthrough (architecture), an opening between the kitchen and the dining room
- Pass-through (economics), offsetting a change in costs by changing prices
  - Exchange-rate pass-through
- Pass-through entity, a term in the US tax law
- Pass-through certificate, a financial instrument accessing the related Pass-through security
- Pass-through, a sporting term to indicate a player that has won a game or match due to forfeit by their opponent
