= KWP =

KWP may refer to:

== Businesses and organisations ==
- King World Productions, an American TV production company
- Konspiracyjne Wojsko Polskie, a Polish paramilitary organisation
- Korean Workers' Party, the ruling party of North Korea
- Kurdistan Workers' Party, a Kurdish militant political organisation

== Education ==
- Kaurna Warra Pintyanthi, a Kaurna language college in Adelaide, Australia
- Konservatorium Wien, a music conservatory in Vienna, Austria

== Technology ==
- Key Word Protocol, in automotive diagnostics
- Kilowatt-peak (kWp), for solar panel output
