= Unified Diagnostic Services =

Diagnostic communication protocol

Unified Diagnostic Services (UDS) is a diagnostic communication protocol used by electronic control units (ECUs) in automotive electronics. UDS is defined by ISO 14229 and evolved from ISO 14230 (KWP2000), which is now largely obsolete. UDS specifies functionality at the session, presentation, and application layers (layers 5–7) of the OSI model. Because of this, it can operate on different physical and data link layers such as CAN (ISO 11898), LIN (ISO 17987), Ethernet (ISO 13400), FlexRay (ISO 17458), and K-Line (ISO 14230). In practice, UDS is most commonly used over CAN via Diagnostic over CAN (DoCAN), defined in ISO 15765.

The term "unified" refers to the fact that UDS is an international standard rather than a manufacturer-specific protocol. Today, nearly all Tier 1 suppliers implement UDS in ECUs developed for automotive original equipment manufacturers (OEMs). UDS is also integrated into larger software architectures, including AUTOSAR.

Modern vehicles have a diagnostic interface for on-board diagnostics, which makes it possible to connect a computer (client) or diagnostics tool, which is referred to as tester, to the communication system of the vehicle. Thus, UDS requests can be sent to the controllers which provide responses (this may be positive or negative). This makes it possible to interrogate the fault memory of the individual control units, to update them with new firmware, have low-level interaction with their hardware (e.g. to turn a specific output on or off), or to make use of special functions (referred to as routines) to attempt to understand the environment and operating conditions of an ECU to be able to diagnose faulty or otherwise undesirable behavior.

== Services ==
SID (Service Identifier)

Request Service Identifier (SID)	Response Service Identifier (RSID)	Service name	Description
0x10	0x50	DiagnosticSessionControl	DiagnosticSessionControl service is used to change diagnostic sessions in the server(s). In each diagnostic session a different set of diagnostic services (and/or functionalities) is enabled in the server. Server shall always be in exactly one diagnostic session.
0x11	0x51	ECUReset	ECUReset service is used by the client to request that the server perform a reset. The server, after receiving this request, performs the specified type of reset (either before or after transmitting the positive response).
0x14	0x54	ClearDiagnosticInformation	ClearDiagnosticInformation service is used by the client to clear Diagnostic Trouble Codes (DTCs) and related data stored in one or more server memories.
0x19	0x59	ReadDTCInformation	ReadDTCInformation service allows the client to request current Diagnostic Trouble Code (DTC) information from one or more servers within the vehicle.
0x22	0x62	ReadDataByIdentifier	ReadDataByIdentifier service allows the client to request data record values from the server identifier by one or more DataIdentifiers (DIDs).
0x23	0x63	ReadMemoryByAddress	ReadMemoryByAddress service allows the client to request server's memory data stored under provided memory address.
0x24	0x64	ReadScalingDataByIdentifier	ReadScalingDataByIdentifier service allows the client to request the scaling information associated with a Data Identifier (DID). Scaling data provides information required to correctly interpret the actual data value, such as: data encoding type (e.g. integer, floating-point, ASCII); units and formats; conversion formulas and coefficients; bit mappings, and other interpretation details
0x27	0x67	SecurityAccess	SecurityAccess service allows the client to unlock functions/services with restricted access. Unlocking sequence: 1. The client requests a seed from the server.; 2. The server responds with a positive response that includes a randomly generated seed value.; 3. Both the client and server compute a key value based on the seed (using a secret algorithm).; 4. The client sends the computed key to the server.; 5. The server validates the client by comparing the received key with its own calculated key. If they match, the client is granted access to the protected functionality for the corresponding security level.
0x28	0x68	CommunicationControl	CommunicationControl service allows the client to switch on/off the transmission and/or the reception of certain messages on the server(s).
0x29	0x69	Authentication	Authentication service provides a mechanism for the client to prove its identity, allowing access to data and/or diagnostic services that have restricted access due to security, emissions, or safety requirements. It is an alternative for SecurityAccess service.
0x2A	0x6A	ReadDataByPeriodicIdentifier	ReadDataByPeriodicIdentifier service allows the client to request periodic transmission of data record values from the server. Each periodic data record is identified by Periodic DID (the second byte of a DID with a fixed first byte 0xF2).
0x2C	0x6C	DynamicallyDefineDataIdentifier	DynamicallyDefineDataIdentifier service allows the client to define Data Identifiers.
0x2E	0x6E	WriteDataByIdentifier	WriteDataByIdentifier service allows the client to set data values stored under given Data Identifier.
0x2F	0x6F	InputOutputControlByIdentifier	InputOutputControlByIdentifier service allows the client to take temporary control over Data Identifier values.
0x31	0x71	RoutineControl	RoutineControl service allows the client to execute any sequence of actions that are defined as routines. Each routine has Routine Identifier assigned.
0x34	0x74	RequestDownload	RequestDownload service allows the client to initiate data transfer from the client to the server.
0x35	0x75	RequestUpload	RequestUpload service allows the client to initiate data transfer from the server to the client.
0x36	0x76	TransferData	TransferData service transfers the actual data that were earlier requested by either RequestDownload, RequestUpload or RequestFileTransfer service.
0x37	0x77	RequestTransferExit	RequestTransferExit services ends the data transmission using TransferData service.
0x38	0x78	RequestFileTransfer	RequestFileTransfer service allows the client to initiate a file transfer (either download or upload). It is an alternative for RequestDownload and RequestUpload services.
0x3D	0x7D	WriteMemoryByAddress	WriteMemoryByAddress service allows the client to set values directly in the server's memory.
0x3E	0x7E	TesterPresent	TesterPresent service informs server(s) that the diagnostic tester device (client) is connected and server(s) shall not exit their current diagnostic session.
0x83	0xC3	AccessTimingParameter	AccessTimingParameter was withdrawn in ISO 14229-1:2020.
0x84	0xC4	SecuredDataTransmission	SecuredDataTransmission service allows the client to secure UDS communication using either encryption or signature.
0x85	0xC5	ControlDTCSettings	ControlDTCSettings service allows the client to manage DTCs' statuses updating.
0x86	0xC6	ResponseOnEvent	ResponseOnEvent service allows the client to define events and request messages that the server is supposed to respond to when the event occurs. This can be used to diagnose complicated issues. For example the client can request from the server to respond to ReadMemoryByAddress request (to provide detailed information about the reason for DTC reporting) when testFailed bit of a certain DTC is set.
0x87	0xC7	LinkControl	LinkControl service allows the client to change physical connection parameters. As an example, for CAN bus, the client could change baudrate and version of CAN protocol (e.g. from CAN-FD to Classical CAN).

== Diagnostic Message ==
There are two types of diagnostic messages transmitted using UDS protocol:

- Request
- Response

=== Request Message ===
Request messages are transmitted by a Client towards one or more Servers.

Service Identifier (SID) is the first byte in each request message.

=== Response Message ===
Response messages are transmitted by Servers to a Client.

The first byte in the response message is usually Response Service Identifier (RSID) value (with the exception of following responses to ReadDataByPeriodicIdentifier service).

==== Positive Response Message ====
Format of each positive response message is specific for the diagnostic service it relates to.

==== Negative Response Message ====
Negative Response Message format
Byte	Value	Description
#1	0x7F	Negative Response SID
#2	SID	SID value from request message
#3	NRC	reason for the rejection

===== Negative Response Codes =====
Negative Response Codes (NRC in short) carry the information for request message rejection.

Negative Response Codes
Value	Name
0x10	generalReject
0x11	serviceNotSupported
0x12	SubFunctionNotSupported
0x13	incorrectMessageLengthOrInvalidFormat
0x14	responseTooLong
0x21	busyRepeatRequest
0x22	conditionsNotCorrect
0x24	requestSequenceError
0x25	noResponseFromSubnetComponent
0x26	FailurePreventsExecutionOfRequestedAction
0x31	requestOutOfRange
0x33	securityAccessDenied
0x34	authenticationRequired
0x35	invalidKey
0x36	exceedNumberOfAttempts
0x37	requiredTimeDelayNotExpired
0x38	secureDataTransmissionRequired
0x39	secureDataTransmissionNotAllowed
0x3A	secureDataVerificationFailed
0x50	Certificate verification failed, Invalid Time Period
0x51	Certificate verification failed, Invalid Signature
0x52	Certificate verification failed, Invalid Chain of Trust
0x53	Certificate verification failed, Invalid Type
0x54	Certificate verification failed, Invalid Format
0x55	Certificate verification failed, Invalid Content
0x56	Certificate verification failed, Invalid Scope
0x57	Certificate verification failed, Invalid Certificate (revoked)
0x58	Ownership verification failed
0x59	Challenge calculation failed
0x5A	Setting Access Rights failed
0x5B	Session key creation/derivation failed
0x5C	Configuration data usage failed
0x5D	DeAuthentication failed
0x70	uploadDownloadNotAccepted
0x71	transferDataSuspended
0x72	generalProgrammingFailure
0x73	wrongBlockSequenceCounter
0x78	requestCorrectlyReceived-ResponsePending
0x7E	SubFunctionNotSupportedInActiveSession
0x7F	serviceNotSupportedInActiveSession
0x81	rpmTooHigh
0x82	rpmTooLow
0x83	engineIsRunning
0x84	engineIsNotRunning
0x85	engineRunTimeTooLow
0x86	temperatureTooHigh
0x87	temperatureTooLow
0x88	vehicleSpeedTooHigh
0x89	vehicleSpeedTooLow
0x8A	throttle/PedalTooHigh
0x8B	throttle/PedalTooLow
0x8C	transmissionRangeNotInNeutral
0x8D	transmissionRangeNotInGear
0x8F	brakeSwitch(es)NotClosed (Brake Pedal not pressed or not applied)
0x90	shifterLeverNotInPark
0x91	torqueConverterClutchLocked
0x92	voltageTooHigh
0x93	voltageTooLow
0x94	ResourceTemporarilyNotAvailable

== See also ==
- On-board diagnostics, general article about diagnostic services in vehicles
- OBD-II PIDs, about the US standard
- UDS Knowledge Base - py-uds package
