= Data link (disambiguation) =

In telecommunications a data link is the means of connecting one location to another for the purpose of transmitting and receiving digital information.

Data link or datalink may also refer to:-

- Data link layer, layer 2 in the OSI model of networking and part of the link layer in TCP/IP, amongst others
- Data link connector (DTC), the multi-pin diagnostic connection port for automobiles, trucks, and motorcycles
- Timex Datalink, a smartwatch manufactured by Timex during the 1990s
- A "data:" link in an HTML file (see Data URI scheme)
