= OBD-II PIDs =

Codes used for on-board diagnostics

OBD-II PIDs (On-board diagnostics Parameter IDs) are codes used to request data from a vehicle, used as a diagnostic tool.

SAE standard J1979 defines many OBD-II PIDs. All on-road vehicles and trucks sold in North America are required to support a subset of these codes, primarily for state mandated emissions inspections. Manufacturers also define additional PIDs specific to their vehicles. Though not mandated, many motorcycles also support OBD-II PIDs.

In 1996, light-duty vehicles (less than 8,500 lb or 3,900 kg) were the first to be mandated followed by medium duty vehicles (8,500–14,000 lb or 3,900–6,400 kg) in 2005. They are both required to be accessed through a standardized data link connector defined by SAE J1962.

Heavy-duty vehicles (greater than 14,000 lb or 6,400 kg) made after 2010, for sale in the US are allowed to support OBD-II diagnostics through SAE standard J1939-13 (a round diagnostic connector) according to CARB in title 13 CCR 1971.1. Some heavy-duty trucks in North America use the SAE J1962 OBD-II diagnostic connector that is common with passenger cars, notably Mack and Volvo Trucks, however they use 29 bit CAN identifiers (unlike 11 bit headers used by passenger cars).

== Services / Modes ==
There are 10 diagnostic services described in the latest OBD-II standard SAE J1979. Before 2002, J1979 referred to these services as "modes". They are as follows:

Service / Mode (hex)	Description
01	Show current data
02	Show freeze frame data
03	Show stored Diagnostic Trouble Codes
04	Clear Diagnostic Trouble Codes and stored values
05	Test results, oxygen sensor monitoring (non CAN only)
06	Test results, other component/system monitoring (Test results, oxygen sensor monitoring for CAN only)
07	Show pending Diagnostic Trouble Codes (detected during current or last driving cycle)
08	Control operation of on-board component/system
09	Request vehicle information
0A	Permanent Diagnostic Trouble Codes (DTCs) (Cleared DTCs)

Vehicle manufacturers are not required to support all services. Each manufacturer may define additional services above #9 (e.g.: service 22 as defined by SAE J2190 for Ford/GM, service 21 for Toyota) for other information e.g. the voltage of the traction battery in a hybrid electric vehicle (HEV).

The nonOBD UDS services start at 0x10 to avoid overlap of ID-range.

== Standard PIDs ==
The table below shows the standard OBD-II PIDs as defined by SAE J1979. The expected response for each PID is given, along with information on how to translate the response into meaningful data. Again, not all vehicles will support all PIDs and there can be manufacturer-defined custom PIDs that are not defined in the OBD-II standard.

Note that services 01 and 02 are basically identical, except that service 01 provides current information, whereas service 02 provides a snapshot of the same data taken at the point when the last diagnostic trouble code was set. The exceptions are PID 01, which is only available in service 01, and PID 02, which is only available in service 02. If service 02 PID 02 returns zero, then there is no snapshot and all other service 02 data is meaningless.

When using Bit-Encoded-Notation, quantities like C4 means bit 4 from data byte C. Each bit is numbered from 0 to 7, so 7 is the most significant bit and 0 is the least significant bit (See below).

A								B								C								D							
A7	A6	A5	A4	A3	A2	A1	A0	B7	B6	B5	B4	B3	B2	B1	B0	C7	C6	C5	C4	C3	C2	C1	C0	D7	D6	D5	D4	D3	D2	D1	D0

=== Service 01 - Show current data ===
PIDs (hex)	PID (Dec)	Data bytes returned	Description	Min value	Max value	Units	Formula (Note: In the formula column, letters A, B, C, etc. represent the first, second, third, etc. byte of the data. For example, for two data bytes 0F 19, A = 0F and B = 19. Where a (?) appears, contradictory or incomplete information was available.)
00	0	4	PIDs supported [$01 - $20]				Bit encoded [A7..D0] == [PID $01..PID $20] See below
01	1	4	Monitor status since DTCs cleared. (Includes malfunction indicator lamp (MIL), status and number of DTCs, components tests, DTC readiness checks)				Bit encoded. See below
02	2	2	DTC that caused freeze frame to be stored.				Decoded as in service 3
03	3	2	Fuel system status				Bit encoded. See below
04	4	1	Calculated engine load	0	100	%	$\tfrac{100}{255} A$ (or $\tfrac {A} {2.55}$)
05	5	1	Engine coolant temperature	-40	215	°C	$A - 40$
06	6	1	Short term fuel trim (STFT)—Bank 1	-100 (Reduce Fuel: Too Rich)	99.2 (Add Fuel: Too Lean)	%	$$\frac{100}{128} A - 100$$ (or $\tfrac{A}{1.28} - 100$ )
07	7	1	Long term fuel trim (LTFT)—Bank 1	-100 (Reduce Fuel: Too Rich)	99.2 (Add Fuel: Too Lean)	%	$$\frac{100}{128} A - 100$$ (or $\tfrac{A}{1.28} - 100$ )
08	8	1	Short term fuel trim (STFT)—Bank 2	-100 (Reduce Fuel: Too Rich)	99.2 (Add Fuel: Too Lean)	%	$$\frac{100}{128} A - 100$$ (or $\tfrac{A}{1.28} - 100$ )
09	9	1	Long term fuel trim (LTFT)—Bank 2	-100 (Reduce Fuel: Too Rich)	99.2 (Add Fuel: Too Lean)	%	$$\frac{100}{128} A - 100$$ (or $\tfrac{A}{1.28} - 100$ )
0A	10	1	Fuel pressure (gauge pressure)	0	765	kPa	$3 A$
0B	11	1	Intake manifold absolute pressure	0	255	kPa	$A$
0C	12	2	Engine speed	0	16,383.75	rpm	$\frac{256 A + B}{4}$
0D	13	1	Vehicle speed	0	255	km/h	$A$
0E	14	1	Timing advance	-64	63.5	° before TDC	$\frac{A}{2} - 64$
0F	15	1	Intake air temperature	-40	215	°C	$A - 40$
10	16	2	Mass air flow sensor (MAF) air flow rate	0	655.35	g/s	$\frac{256 A + B}{100}$
11	17	1	Throttle position	0	100	%	$\tfrac{100}{255} A$
12	18	1	Commanded secondary air status				Bit encoded. See below
13	19	1	Oxygen sensors present (in 2 banks)				[A0..A3] == Bank 1, Sensors 1-4. [A4..A7] == Bank 2...
14	20	2	Oxygen Sensor 1 A: Voltage; B: Short term fuel trim	0 -100	1.275; 99.2	V %	$$\frac{A}{200}$$ $$\frac{100}{128} B - 100$$ (if B==$FF, sensor is not used in trim calculation)
15	21	2	Oxygen Sensor 2 A: Voltage; B: Short term fuel trim	0 -100	1.275; 99.2	V %	$$\frac{A}{200}$$ $$\frac{100}{128} B - 100$$ (if B==$FF, sensor is not used in trim calculation)
16	22	2	Oxygen Sensor 3 A: Voltage; B: Short term fuel trim	0 -100	1.275; 99.2	V %	$$\frac{A}{200}$$ $$\frac{100}{128} B - 100$$ (if B==$FF, sensor is not used in trim calculation)
17	23	2	Oxygen Sensor 4 A: Voltage; B: Short term fuel trim	0 -100	1.275; 99.2	V %	$$\frac{A}{200}$$ $$\frac{100}{128} B - 100$$ (if B==$FF, sensor is not used in trim calculation)
18	24	2	Oxygen Sensor 5 A: Voltage; B: Short term fuel trim	0 -100	1.275; 99.2	V %	$$\frac{A}{200}$$ $$\frac{100}{128} B - 100$$ (if B==$FF, sensor is not used in trim calculation)
19	25	2	Oxygen Sensor 6 A: Voltage; B: Short term fuel trim	0 -100	1.275; 99.2	V %	$$\frac{A}{200}$$ $$\frac{100}{128} B - 100$$ (if B==$FF, sensor is not used in trim calculation)
1A	26	2	Oxygen Sensor 7 A: Voltage; B: Short term fuel trim	0 -100	1.275; 99.2	V %	$$\frac{A}{200}$$ $$\frac{100}{128} B - 100$$ (if B==$FF, sensor is not used in trim calculation)
1B	27	2	Oxygen Sensor 8 A: Voltage; B: Short term fuel trim	0 -100	1.275; 99.2	V %	$$\frac{A}{200}$$ $$\frac{100}{128} B - 100$$ (if B==$FF, sensor is not used in trim calculation)
1C	28	1	OBD standards this vehicle conforms to	1	250		enumerated. See below
1D	29	1	Oxygen sensors present (in 4 banks)				Similar to PID $13, but [A0..A7] == [B1S1, B1S2, B2S1, B2S2, B3S1, B3S2, B4S1, B4S2]
1E	30	1	Auxiliary input status				A0 == Power Take Off (PTO) status (1 == active) [A1..A7] not used
1F	31	2	Run time since engine start	0	65,535	s	$256 A + B$
20	32	4	PIDs supported [$21 - $40]				Bit encoded [A7..D0] == [PID $21..PID $40] See below
21	33	2	Distance traveled with malfunction indicator lamp (MIL) on	0	65,535	km	$256 A + B$
22	34	2	Fuel Rail Pressure (relative to manifold vacuum)	0	5177.265	kPa	$0.079 (256 A + B)$
23	35	2	Fuel Rail Gauge Pressure (diesel, or gasoline direct injection)	0	655,350	kPa	$10 (256 A + B)$
24	36	4	Oxygen Sensor 1 AB: Air-Fuel Equivalence Ratio (lambda,λ); CD: Voltage	0; 0	< 2 < 8	ratio V	$$\frac{2}{65536} (256 A + B)$$ $$\frac{8}{65536} (256 C + D)$$
25	37	4	Oxygen Sensor 2 AB: Air-Fuel Equivalence Ratio (lambda,λ); CD: Voltage	0; 0	< 2 < 8	ratio V	$$\frac{2}{65536} (256 A + B)$$ $$\frac{8}{65536} (256 C + D)$$
26	38	4	Oxygen Sensor 3 AB: Air-Fuel Equivalence Ratio (lambda,λ); CD: Voltage	0; 0	< 2 < 8	ratio V	$$\frac{2}{65536} (256 A + B)$$ $$\frac{8}{65536} (256 C + D)$$
27	39	4	Oxygen Sensor 4 AB: Air-Fuel Equivalence Ratio (lambda,λ); CD: Voltage	0; 0	< 2 < 8	ratio V	$$\frac{2}{65536} (256 A + B)$$ $$\frac{8}{65536} (256 C + D)$$
28	40	4	Oxygen Sensor 5 AB: Air-Fuel Equivalence Ratio (lambda,λ); CD: Voltage	0; 0	< 2 < 8	ratio V	$$\frac{2}{65536} (256 A + B)$$ $$\frac{8}{65536} (256 C + D)$$
29	41	4	Oxygen Sensor 6 AB: Air-Fuel Equivalence Ratio (lambda,λ); CD: Voltage	0; 0	< 2 < 8	ratio V	$$\frac{2}{65536} (256 A + B)$$ $$\frac{8}{65536} (256 C + D)$$
2A	42	4	Oxygen Sensor 7 AB: Air-Fuel Equivalence Ratio (lambda,λ); CD: Voltage	0; 0	< 2 < 8	ratio V	$$\frac{2}{65536} (256 A + B)$$ $$\frac{8}{65536} (256 C + D)$$
2B	43	4	Oxygen Sensor 8 AB: Air-Fuel Equivalence Ratio (lambda,λ); CD: Voltage	0; 0	< 2 < 8	ratio V	$$\frac{2}{65536} (256 A + B)$$ $$\frac{8}{65536} (256 C + D)$$
2C	44	1	Commanded EGR	0	100	%	$\tfrac{100}{255} A$
2D	45	1	EGR Error	-100	99.2	%	$\tfrac{100}{128} A - 100$
2E	46	1	Commanded evaporative purge	0	100	%	$\tfrac{100}{255} A$
2F	47	1	Fuel Tank Level Input	0	100	%	$\tfrac{100}{255} A$
30	48	1	Warm-ups since codes cleared	0	255		$A$
31	49	2	Distance traveled since codes cleared	0	65,535	km	$256 A + B$
32	50	2	Evap. System Vapor Pressure	-8,192	8191.75	Pa	$\frac{256 A + B}{4}$ (AB is two's complement signed)
33	51	1	Absolute Barometric Pressure	0	255	kPa	$A$
34	52	4	Oxygen Sensor 1 AB: Air-Fuel Equivalence Ratio (lambda,λ); CD: Current	0 -128	< 2 <128	ratio mA	$$\frac{2}{65536} (256 A + B)$$ $$\frac{256 C + D}{256} - 128$$
35	53	4	Oxygen Sensor 2 AB: Air-Fuel Equivalence Ratio (lambda,λ); CD: Current	0 -128	< 2 <128	ratio mA	$$\frac{2}{65536} (256 A + B)$$ $$\frac{256 C + D}{256} - 128$$
36	54	4	Oxygen Sensor 3 AB: Air-Fuel Equivalence Ratio (lambda,λ); CD: Current	0 -128	< 2 <128	ratio mA	$$\frac{2}{65536} (256 A + B)$$ $$\frac{256 C + D}{256} - 128$$
37	55	4	Oxygen Sensor 4 AB: Air-Fuel Equivalence Ratio (lambda,λ); CD: Current	0 -128	< 2 <128	ratio mA	$$\frac{2}{65536} (256 A + B)$$ $$\frac{256 C + D}{256} - 128$$
38	56	4	Oxygen Sensor 5 AB: Air-Fuel Equivalence Ratio (lambda,λ); CD: Current	0 -128	< 2 <128	ratio mA	$$\frac{2}{65536} (256 A + B)$$ $$\frac{256 C + D}{256} - 128$$
39	57	4	Oxygen Sensor 6 AB: Air-Fuel Equivalence Ratio (lambda,λ); CD: Current	0 -128	< 2 <128	ratio mA	$$\frac{2}{65536} (256 A + B)$$ $$\frac{256 C + D}{256} - 128$$
3A	58	4	Oxygen Sensor 7 AB: Air-Fuel Equivalence Ratio (lambda,λ); CD: Current	0 -128	< 2 <128	ratio mA	$$\frac{2}{65536} (256 A + B)$$ $$\frac{256 C + D}{256} - 128$$
3B	59	4	Oxygen Sensor 8 AB: Air-Fuel Equivalence Ratio (lambda,λ); CD: Current	0 -128	< 2 <128	ratio mA	$$\frac{2}{65536} (256 A + B)$$ $$\frac{256 C + D}{256} - 128$$
3C	60	2	Catalyst Temperature: Bank 1, Sensor 1	-40	6,513.5	°C	$\frac{256 A + B}{10} - 40$
3D	61	2	Catalyst Temperature: Bank 2, Sensor 1	-40	6,513.5	°C	$\frac{256 A + B}{10} - 40$
3E	62	2	Catalyst Temperature: Bank 1, Sensor 2	-40	6,513.5	°C	$\frac{256 A + B}{10} - 40$
3F	63	2	Catalyst Temperature: Bank 2, Sensor 2	-40	6,513.5	°C	$\frac{256 A + B}{10} - 40$
40	64	4	PIDs supported [$41 - $60]				Bit encoded [A7..D0] == [PID $41..PID $60] See below
41	65	4	Monitor status this drive cycle				Bit encoded. See below
42	66	2	Control module voltage	0	65.535	V	$\frac{256A + B}{1000}$
43	67	2	Absolute load value	0	25,700	%	$\tfrac{100}{255} (256A + B)$
44	68	2	Commanded Air-Fuel Equivalence Ratio (lambda,λ)	0	< 2	ratio	$\tfrac{2}{65536} (256 A + B)$
45	69	1	Relative throttle position	0	100	%	$\tfrac{100}{255} A$
46	70	1	Ambient air temperature	-40	215	°C	$A - 40$
47	71	1	Absolute throttle position B	0	100	%	$\frac{100}{255} A$
48	72	1	Absolute throttle position C	0	100	%	$\frac{100}{255} A$
49	73	1	Accelerator pedal position D	0	100	%	$\frac{100}{255} A$
4A	74	1	Accelerator pedal position E	0	100	%	$\frac{100}{255} A$
4B	75	1	Accelerator pedal position F	0	100	%	$\frac{100}{255} A$
4C	76	1	Commanded throttle actuator	0	100	%	$\frac{100}{255} A$
4D	77	2	Time run with MIL on	0	65,535	min	$256 A + B$
4E	78	2	Time since trouble codes cleared	0	65,535	min	$256 A + B$
4F	79	4	Maximum value for Fuel–Air equivalence ratio, oxygen sensor voltage, oxygen sensor current, and intake manifold absolute pressure	0, 0, 0, 0	255, 255, 255, 2550	ratio, V, mA, kPa	$A$, $B$, $C$, $D \times 10$
50	80	4	Maximum value for air flow rate from mass air flow sensor	0	2550	g/s	$A \times 10$; $B$, $C$, and $D$ are reserved for future use
51	81	1	Fuel Type				From fuel type table see below
52	82	1	Ethanol fuel %	0	100	%	$\tfrac{100}{255} A$
53	83	2	Absolute Evap system Vapor Pressure	0	327.675	kPa	$\frac{256A + B}{200}$
54	84	2	Evap system vapor pressure	-32,768	32,767	Pa	$256 A + B$(AB is two's complement signed)
55	85	2	Short term secondary oxygen sensor trim, A: bank 1, B: bank 3	-100	99.2	%	$\frac{100}{128}A - 100$ $\frac{100}{128} B - 100$
56	86	2	Long term secondary oxygen sensor trim, A: bank 1, B: bank 3	-100	99.2	%	$\frac{100}{128}A - 100$ $\frac{100}{128} B - 100$
57	87	2	Short term secondary oxygen sensor trim, A: bank 2, B: bank 4	-100	99.2	%	$\frac{100}{128}A - 100$ $\frac{100}{128} B - 100$
58	88	2	Long term secondary oxygen sensor trim, A: bank 2, B: bank 4	-100	99.2	%	$\frac{100}{128}A - 100$ $\frac{100}{128} B - 100$
59	89	2	Fuel rail absolute pressure	0	655,350	kPa	$10 (256 A + B)$
5A	90	1	Relative accelerator pedal position	0	100	%	$\tfrac{100}{255} A$
5B	91	1	Hybrid battery pack remaining life	0	100	%	$\tfrac{100}{255} A$
5C	92	1	Engine oil temperature	-40	210	°C	$A - 40$
5D	93	2	Fuel injection timing	-210.00	301.992	°	$\frac{256A + B}{128} - 210$
5E	94	2	Engine fuel rate	0	3212.75	L/h	$\frac{256A + B}{20}$
5F	95	1	Emission requirements to which vehicle is designed				Bit Encoded
60	96	4	PIDs supported [$61 - $80]				Bit encoded [A7..D0] == [PID $61..PID $80] See below
61	97	1	Driver's demand engine - percent torque	-125	130	%	$A-125$
62	98	1	Actual engine - percent torque	-125	130	%	$A-125$
63	99	2	Engine reference torque	0	65,535	N⋅m	$256 A + B$
64	100	5	Engine percent torque data	-125	130	%	$A-125$ Idle $B-125$ Engine point 1 $C-125$ Engine point 2 $D-125$ Engine point 3 $E-125$ Engine point 4
65	101	2	Auxiliary input / output supported				Bit Encoded
66	102	5	Mass air flow sensor	0	2047.96875	g/s	[A0]== Sensor A Supported [A1]== Sensor B Supported; Sensor A:$\frac{256B+C}{32}$ Sensor B:$\frac{256D+E}{32}$
67	103	3	Engine coolant temperature	-40	215	°C	[A0]== Sensor 1 Supported [A1]== Sensor 2 Supported; Sensor 1:$B-40$ Sensor 2:$C-40$
68	104	3	Intake air temperature sensor	-40	215	°C	[A0]== Sensor 1 Supported [A1]== Sensor 2 Supported; Sensor 1:$B-40$ Sensor 2:$C-40$
69	105	7	Actual EGR, Commanded EGR, and EGR Error				
6A	106	5	Commanded Diesel intake air flow control and relative intake air flow position				
6B	107	5	Exhaust gas recirculation temperature				
6C	108	5	Commanded throttle actuator control and relative throttle position				
6D	109	11	Fuel pressure control system				
6E	110	9	Injection pressure control system				
6F	111	3	Turbocharger compressor inlet pressure				
70	112	10	Boost pressure control	0	2047.96875	kPa	Sensor 1: $\frac{256D+E}{0.03125}$
71	113	6	Variable Geometry turbo (VGT) control				
72	114	5	Wastegate control				
73	115	5	Exhaust pressure				
74	116	5	Turbocharger RPM				
75	117	7	Turbocharger temperature				
76	118	7	Turbocharger temperature				
77	119	5	Charge air cooler temperature (CACT)				
78	120	9	Exhaust Gas temperature (EGT) Bank 1				Special PID. See below
79	121	9	Exhaust Gas temperature (EGT) Bank 2				Special PID. See below
7A	122	7	Diesel particulate filter (DPF) differential pressure				
7B	123	7	Diesel particulate filter (DPF)				
7C	124	9	Diesel Particulate filter (DPF) temperature			°C	$\frac{256 A + B}{10} - 40$
7D	125	1	NOx NTE (Not-To-Exceed) control area status				
7E	126	1	PM NTE (Not-To-Exceed) control area status				
7F	127	13	Engine run time (Note: Starting with MY 2010 the California Air Resources Board mandated that all diesel vehicles must supply total engine hours)			s	$B(2^{24}) + C(2^{16}) + D(2^{8}) + E$
80	128	4	PIDs supported [$81 - $A0]				Bit encoded [A7..D0] == [PID $81..PID $A0] See below
81	129	41	Engine run time for Auxiliary Emissions Control Device(AECD)				
82	130	41	Engine run time for Auxiliary Emissions Control Device(AECD)				
83	131	9	NOx sensor				
84	132	1	Manifold surface temperature				
85	133	10	NOx reagent system			%	$\tfrac{100}{255} F$
86	134	5	Particulate matter (PM) sensor				
87	135	5	Intake manifold absolute pressure				
88	136	13	SCR Induce System				
89	137	41	Run Time for AECD #11-#15				
8A	138	41	Run Time for AECD #16-#20				
8B	139	7	Diesel Aftertreatment				
8C	140	17	O2 Sensor (Wide Range)				
8D	141	1	Throttle Position G	0	100	%	
8E	142	1	Engine Friction - Percent Torque	-125	130	%	$A - 125$
8F	143	7	PM Sensor Bank 1 & 2				
90	144	3	WWH-OBD Vehicle OBD System Information			h	
91	145	5	WWH-OBD Vehicle OBD System Information			h	
92	146	2	Fuel System Control				
93	147	3	WWH-OBD Vehicle OBD Counters support			h	
94	148	12	NOx Warning And Inducement System				
98	152	9	Exhaust Gas Temperature Sensor				
99	153	9	Exhaust Gas Temperature Sensor				
9A	154	6	Hybrid/EV Vehicle System Data, Battery, Voltage				
9B	155	4	Diesel Exhaust Fluid Sensor Data			%	$\tfrac{100}{255} D$
9C	156	17	O2 Sensor Data				
9D	157	4	Engine Fuel Rate			g/s	
9E	158	2	Engine Exhaust Flow Rate			kg/h	
9F	159	9	Fuel System Percentage Use				
A0	160	4	PIDs supported [$A1 - $C0]				Bit encoded [A7..D0] == [PID $A1..PID $C0] See below
A1	161	9	NOx Sensor Corrected Data			ppm	
A2	162	2	Cylinder Fuel Rate	0	2047.96875	mg/stroke	$\frac{256 A + B}{32}$
A3	163	9	Evap System Vapor Pressure			Pa	
A4	164	4	Transmission Actual Gear	0	65.535	ratio	[A1]==Supported $\frac{256C+D}{1000}$
A5	165	4	Commanded Diesel Exhaust Fluid Dosing	0	127.5	%	[A0]= 1:Supported; 0:Unsupported $\frac{B}{2}$
A6	166	4	Odometer (Note: Starting with MY 2019 the California Air Resources Board mandated that all vehicles must supply odometer)	0	429,496,729.5	km	$\frac{A(2^{24}) + B(2^{16}) + C(2^{8}) + D}{10}$
A7	167	4	NOx Sensor Concentration Sensors 3 and 4				
A8	168	4	NOx Sensor Corrected Concentration Sensors 3 and 4				
A9	169	4	ABS Disable Switch State				[A0]= 1:Supported; 0:Unsupported [B0]= 1:Yes;0:No
C0	192	4	PIDs supported [$C1 - $E0]				Bit encoded [A7..D0] == [PID $C1..PID $E0] See below
C3	195	2	Fuel Level Input A/B	0	25,700	%	Returns numerous data, including Drive Condition ID and Engine Speed*
C4	196	8	Exhaust Particulate Control System Diagnostic Time/Count	0	4,294,967,295	seconds / Count	B5 is Engine Idle Request; B6 is Engine Stop Request*; First byte = Time in seconds Second byte = Count
C5	197	4	Fuel Pressure A and B	0	5,177	kPa	
C6	198	7	Byte 1 - Particulate control - driver inducement system status Byte 2,3 - Removal or block of the particulate aftertreatment system counter Byte 4,5 - Liquid regent injection system (e.g. fuel-borne catalyst) failure counter Byte 6,7 - Malfunction of Particulate control monitoring system counter	0	65,535	h	
C7	199	2	Distance Since Reflash or Module Replacement	0	65,535	km	
C8	200	1	NOx Control Diagnostic (NCD) and Particulate Control Diagnostic (PCD) Warning Lamp status	-	-	Bit	
PID (hex)	PID (Dec)	Data bytes returned	Description	Min value	Max value	Units	Formula

=== Service 02 - Show freeze frame data ===
Service 02 accepts the same PIDs as service 01, with the same meaning, but information given is from when the freeze frame was created. Note that PID $02 is used to obtain the DTC that triggered the freeze frame.

A person has to send the frame number in the data section of the message.

=== Service 03 - Show stored Diagnostic Trouble Codes (DTCs) ===
PID (hex)	Data bytes returned	Description	Min value	Max value	Units	Formula
N/A	n*6	Request trouble codes				3 codes per message frame. See below

=== Service 04 - Clear Diagnostic Trouble Codes and stored values ===
PID (hex)	Data bytes returned	Description	Min value	Max value	Units	Formula
N/A	0	Clear trouble codes / Malfunction indicator lamp (MIL) / Check engine light				Clears all stored trouble codes and turns the MIL off.

=== Service 05 - Test results, oxygen sensor monitoring (non CAN only) ===
PID (hex)	Data bytes returned	Description	Min value	Max value	Units	Formula
0100	4	OBD Monitor IDs supported ($01 – $20)	0x0	0xffffffff		
0101	2	O2 Sensor Monitor Bank 1 Sensor 1	0.00	1.275	V	0.005 Rich to lean sensor threshold voltage
0102		O2 Sensor Monitor Bank 1 Sensor 2	0.00	1.275	V	0.005 Rich to lean sensor threshold voltage
0103		O2 Sensor Monitor Bank 1 Sensor 3	0.00	1.275	V	0.005 Rich to lean sensor threshold voltage
0104		O2 Sensor Monitor Bank 1 Sensor 4	0.00	1.275	V	0.005 Rich to lean sensor threshold voltage
0105		O2 Sensor Monitor Bank 2 Sensor 1	0.00	1.275	V	0.005 Rich to lean sensor threshold voltage
0106		O2 Sensor Monitor Bank 2 Sensor 2	0.00	1.275	V	0.005 Rich to lean sensor threshold voltage
0107		O2 Sensor Monitor Bank 2 Sensor 3	0.00	1.275	V	0.005 Rich to lean sensor threshold voltage
0108		O2 Sensor Monitor Bank 2 Sensor 4	0.00	1.275	V	0.005 Rich to lean sensor threshold voltage
0109		O2 Sensor Monitor Bank 3 Sensor 1	0.00	1.275	V	0.005 Rich to lean sensor threshold voltage
010A		O2 Sensor Monitor Bank 3 Sensor 2	0.00	1.275	V	0.005 Rich to lean sensor threshold voltage
010B		O2 Sensor Monitor Bank 3 Sensor 3	0.00	1.275	V	0.005 Rich to lean sensor threshold voltage
010C		O2 Sensor Monitor Bank 3 Sensor 4	0.00	1.275	V	0.005 Rich to lean sensor threshold voltage
010D		O2 Sensor Monitor Bank 4 Sensor 1	0.00	1.275	V	0.005 Rich to lean sensor threshold voltage
010E		O2 Sensor Monitor Bank 4 Sensor 2	0.00	1.275	V	0.005 Rich to lean sensor threshold voltage
010F		O2 Sensor Monitor Bank 4 Sensor 3	0.00	1.275	V	0.005 Rich to lean sensor threshold voltage
0110		O2 Sensor Monitor Bank 4 Sensor 4	0.00	1.275	V	0.005 Rich to lean sensor threshold voltage
0201		O2 Sensor Monitor Bank 1 Sensor 1	0.00	1.275	V	0.005 Lean to Rich sensor threshold voltage
0202		O2 Sensor Monitor Bank 1 Sensor 2	0.00	1.275	V	0.005 Lean to Rich sensor threshold voltage
0203		O2 Sensor Monitor Bank 1 Sensor 3	0.00	1.275	V	0.005 Lean to Rich sensor threshold voltage
0204		O2 Sensor Monitor Bank 1 Sensor 4	0.00	1.275	V	0.005 Lean to Rich sensor threshold voltage
0205		O2 Sensor Monitor Bank 2 Sensor 1	0.00	1.275	V	0.005 Lean to Rich sensor threshold voltage
0206		O2 Sensor Monitor Bank 2 Sensor 2	0.00	1.275	V	0.005 Lean to Rich sensor threshold voltage
0207		O2 Sensor Monitor Bank 2 Sensor 3	0.00	1.275	V	0.005 Lean to Rich sensor threshold voltage
0208		O2 Sensor Monitor Bank 2 Sensor 4	0.00	1.275	V	0.005 Lean to Rich sensor threshold voltage
0209		O2 Sensor Monitor Bank 3 Sensor 1	0.00	1.275	V	0.005 Lean to Rich sensor threshold voltage
020A		O2 Sensor Monitor Bank 3 Sensor 2	0.00	1.275	V	0.005 Lean to Rich sensor threshold voltage
020B		O2 Sensor Monitor Bank 3 Sensor 3	0.00	1.275	V	0.005 Lean to Rich sensor threshold voltage
020C		O2 Sensor Monitor Bank 3 Sensor 4	0.00	1.275	V	0.005 Lean to Rich sensor threshold voltage
020D		O2 Sensor Monitor Bank 4 Sensor 1	0.00	1.275	V	0.005 Lean to Rich sensor threshold voltage
020E		O2 Sensor Monitor Bank 4 Sensor 2	0.00	1.275	V	0.005 Lean to Rich sensor threshold voltage
020F		O2 Sensor Monitor Bank 4 Sensor 3	0.00	1.275	V	0.005 Lean to Rich sensor threshold voltage
0210		O2 Sensor Monitor Bank 4 Sensor 4	0.00	1.275	V	0.005 Lean to Rich sensor threshold voltage
PID (hex)	Data bytes returned	Description	Min value	Max value	Units	Formula

=== Service 09 - Request vehicle information ===
PID (hex)	Data bytes returned	Description	Min value	Max value	Units	Formula
00	4	Service 9 supported PIDs ($01 to $20)				Bit encoded. [A7..D0] = [PID $01..PID $20] See below
01	1	VIN Message Count in PID 02. Only for ISO 9141-2, ISO 14230-4 and SAE J1850.				Usually the value will be 5.
02	17	Vehicle Identification Number (VIN)				17-char VIN, ASCII-encoded and left-padded with null chars (0x00) if needed to.
03	1	Calibration ID message count for PID 04. Only for ISO 9141-2, ISO 14230-4 and SAE J1850.				It will be a multiple of 4 (4 messages are needed for each ID).
04	16,32,48,64..	Calibration ID				Up to 16 ASCII chars. Data bytes not used will be reported as null bytes (0x00). Several CALID can be output (16 bytes each)
05	1	Calibration verification numbers (CVN) message count for PID 06. Only for ISO 9141-2, ISO 14230-4 and SAE J1850.				
06	4,8,12,16	Calibration Verification Numbers (CVN) Several CVN can be output (4 bytes each) the number of CVN and CALID must match				Raw data left-padded with null characters (0x00). Usually displayed as hex string.
07	1	In-use performance tracking message count for PID 08 and 0B. Only for ISO 9141-2, ISO 14230-4 and SAE J1850.	8	10		8 if sixteen values are required to be reported, 9 if eighteen values are required to be reported, and 10 if twenty values are required to be reported (one message reports two values, each one consisting in two bytes).
08	4	In-use performance tracking for spark ignition vehicles				4 or 5 messages, each one containing 4 bytes (two values). See below
09	1	ECU name message count for PID 0A				
0A	20	ECU name				ASCII-coded. Right-padded with null chars (0x00).
0B	4	In-use performance tracking for compression ignition vehicles				5 messages, each one containing 4 bytes (two values). See below
PID (hex)	Data bytes returned	Description	Min value	Max value	Units	Formula

=== Bitwise encoded PIDs ===
Some of the PIDs in the above table cannot be explained with a simple formula. A more elaborate explanation of these data is provided here:

==== Service 01 PID 00 - Show PIDs supported ====
A request for this PID returns 4 bytes of data (Big-endian). Each bit, from MSB to LSB, represents one of the next 32 PIDs and specifies whether that PID is supported.

For example, if the car response is BE1FA813, it can be decoded like this:

Hexadecimal	B				E				1				F				A				8				1				3			
Binary	1	0	1	1	1	1	1	0	0	0	0	1	1	1	1	1	1	0	1	0	1	0	0	0	0	0	0	1	0	0	1	1
Supported?	Yes	No	Yes	Yes	Yes	Yes	Yes	No	No	No	No	Yes	Yes	Yes	Yes	Yes	Yes	No	Yes	No	Yes	No	No	No	No	No	No	Yes	No	No	Yes	Yes
PID number	01	02	03	04	05	06	07	08	09	0A	0B	0C	0D	0E	0F	10	11	12	13	14	15	16	17	18	19	1A	1B	1C	1D	1E	1F	20

So, supported PIDs are: 01, 03, 04, 05, 06, 07, 0C, 0D, 0E, 0F, 10, 11, 13, 15, 1C, 1F and 20

==== Service 01 PID 01 - Monitor status since DTCs cleared ====
A request for this PID returns 4 bytes of data, labeled A, B, C and D.

The first byte (A) contains two pieces of information. Bit A7 (MSB of byte A) indicates whether or not the MIL (malfunction indicator light, aka. check engine light) is illuminated. Bits A6 through A0 represent the number of diagnostic trouble codes currently flagged in the ECU.

The second, third, and fourth bytes (B, C and D) give information about the availability and completeness of certain on-board tests ("OBD readiness checks"). The third and fourth bytes are to be interpreted differently depending upon whether the engine is spark ignition (e.g. Otto or Wankel engines) or compression ignition (e.g. Diesel engines). In the second byte (B), bit 3 indicates the engine type and thus how to interpret bytes C and D, with 0 being spark (Otto or Wankel) and 1 (set) being compression (Diesel). Bits B6 to B4 and B2 to B0 are used for information about tests that not engine-type specific, and thus termed common tests. Note that for bits indicating test availability a bit set to 1 indicates available, whilst for bits indicating test completeness a bit set to 0 indicates complete.

Bits	Definition
A7	State of the CEL/MIL (on/off).
A6-A0	Number of confirmed emissions-related DTCs available for display.
B7	Reserved (should be 0)
B6-B4	Bitmap indicating completeness of common tests.
B3	Indication of engine type 0 = Spark ignition (e.g. Otto or Wankel engines); 1 = Compression ignition (e.g. Diesel engines)
B2-B0	Bitmap indicating availability of common tests.
C7-C0	Bitmap indicating availability of engine-type specific tests.
D7-D0	Bitmap indicating completeness of engine-type specific tests.

Bits from byte B representing common test indicators (those not engine-type specific) are mapped as follows:

	Test availability	Test completeness
Components	B2	B6
Fuel System	B1	B5
Misfire	B0	B4

Bytes C and D are mapped as follows for spark ignition engine types (e.g. Otto or Wankel engines):

	Test availability	Test completeness
EGR and/or VVT System	C7	D7
Oxygen Sensor Heater	C6	D6
Oxygen Sensor	C5	D5
Gasoline Particulate Filter (Note: A common misconception is that C4/D4 was A/C Refrigerant, however it had been listed as Reserved in J1979 for years, and was recently defined as GPF.)	C4	D4
Secondary Air System	C3	D3
Evaporative System	C2	D2
Heated Catalyst	C1	D1
Catalyst	C0	D0

Bytes C and D are alternatively mapped as follows for compression ignition engine types (Diesel engines):

	Test availability	Test completeness
EGR and/or VVT System	C7	D7
PM filter monitoring	C6	D6
Exhaust Gas Sensor	C5	D5
Reserved -	C4	D4
Boost Pressure	C3	D3
Reserved -	C2	D2
NOx/SCR Monitor	C1	D1
NMHC Catalyst (Note: NMHC may stand for Non-Methane HydroCarbons, but J1979 does not enlighten us. The translation would be the ammonia sensor in the SCR catalyst.)	C0	D0

==== Service 01 PID 41 - Monitor status this drive cycle ====
A request for this PID returns 4 bytes of data. The data returned is of an identical form to that returned for PID 01, with one exception - the first byte is always zero.

==== Service 01 PID 78 and 79 - Exhaust Gas temperature (EGT) Bank 1 and Bank 2 ====
A request for one of these two PIDs will return 9 bytes of data. PID 78 returns data relating to EGT sensors for bank 1, whilst PID 79 similarly returns data for bank 2. The first byte is a bit encoded field indicating which EGT sensors are supported for the respective bank.

Bytes	Description
A	EGT sensor support
B-C	Temperature read by EGT sensor 1
D-E	Temperature read by EGT sensor 2
F-G	Temperature read by EGT sensor 3
H-I	Temperature read by EGT sensor 4

The first byte is bit-encoded as follows:

Bits	Description
A7-A4	Reserved
A3	EGT sensor 4 supported?
A2	EGT sensor 3 supported?
A1	EGT sensor 2 supported?
A0	EGT sensor 1 supported?

Bytes B through I provide 16-bit integers indicating the temperatures of the sensors. The temperature values are interpreted in degrees Celsius in the range -40 to 6513.5 (scale 0.1), using the usual $(A \times 256 + B) / 10 - 40$ formula (MSB is A, LSB is B). Only values for which the corresponding sensor is supported are meaningful.

==== Service 03 (no PID required) - Show stored Diagnostic Trouble Codes ====
A request for this service returns a list of the DTCs that have been set. The list is encapsulated using the ISO 15765-2 protocol.

If there are two or fewer DTCs (up to 4 bytes) then they are returned in an ISO-TP Single Frame (SF). Three or more DTCs in the list are reported in multiple frames, with the exact count of frames dependent on the communication type and addressing details.

Each trouble code requires 2 bytes to describe. Encoded in these bytes are a category and a number. It is typically shown decoded into a five-character form like "U0158", where the first character (here 'U') represents the category the DTC belongs to, and the remaining four characters are a hexadecimal representation of the number under that category. The first two bits (A7 and A6) of the first byte (A) represent the category. The remaining 14 bits represent the number. Of note is that since the second character is formed from only two bits, it can thus only be within the range 0-3.

Bits	Definition
A7-A6	Category; 00: P - Powertrain; 01: C - Chassis; 10: B - Body; 11: U - Network (Note: Whilst this is commonly referred to as the network category, it may originally have been the 'undefined' category, hence the use of the letter 'U' rather than 'N'.)
A5-B0	Number (within category)

An example DTC of "U0158" would be decoded as follows:

Bit	A7	A6	A5	A4	A3	A2	A1	A0	B7	B6	B5	B4	B3	B2	B1	B0
Binary	1	1	0	0	0	0	0	1	0	1	0	1	1	0	0	0
Hexadecimal	C				1				5				8			
Decoded DTC	U		0		1				5				8			

The resulting five-character code, e.g. "U0158", can be looked up in a table of OBD-II DTCs to get an actual description of what it represents. Of note, whilst some blocks of DTC code ranges have generic meanings that apply to all vehicles and manufacturers, the meanings of others can vary per manufacturer or even model.

It is also worth noting that DTCs may sometimes be encountered in a four-character form, e.g. "C158", which is simply the plain hexadecimal representation of the two bytes, with proper decoding with respect to the category not having been performed.

==== Service 09 PID 08 - In-use performance tracking for spark ignition engines ====
It provides information about track in-use performance for catalyst banks, oxygen sensor banks, evaporative leak detection systems, EGR systems and secondary air system.

The numerator for each component or system tracks the number of times that all conditions necessary for a specific monitor to detect a malfunction have been encountered. The denominator for each component or system tracks the number of times that the vehicle has been operated in the specified conditions.

The count of data items should be reported at the beginning (the first byte).

All data items of the In-use Performance Tracking record consist of two bytes and are reported in this order (each message contains two items, hence the message length is 4).

Mnemonic	Description
OBDCOND	OBD Monitoring Conditions Encountered Counts
IGNCNTR	Ignition Counter
CATCOMP1	Catalyst Monitor Completion Counts Bank 1
CATCOND1	Catalyst Monitor Conditions Encountered Counts Bank 1
CATCOMP2	Catalyst Monitor Completion Counts Bank 2
CATCOND2	Catalyst Monitor Conditions Encountered Counts Bank 2
O2SCOMP1	O2 Sensor Monitor Completion Counts Bank 1
O2SCOND1	O2 Sensor Monitor Conditions Encountered Counts Bank 1
O2SCOMP2	O2 Sensor Monitor Completion Counts Bank 2
O2SCOND2	O2 Sensor Monitor Conditions Encountered Counts Bank 2
EGRCOMP	EGR Monitor Completion Condition Counts
EGRCOND	EGR Monitor Conditions Encountered Counts
AIRCOMP	AIR Monitor Completion Condition Counts (Secondary Air)
AIRCOND	AIR Monitor Conditions Encountered Counts (Secondary Air)
EVAPCOMP	EVAP Monitor Completion Condition Counts
EVAPCOND	EVAP Monitor Conditions Encountered Counts
SO2SCOMP1	Secondary O2 Sensor Monitor Completion Counts Bank 1
SO2SCOND1	Secondary O2 Sensor Monitor Conditions Encountered Counts Bank 1
SO2SCOMP2	Secondary O2 Sensor Monitor Completion Counts Bank 2
SO2SCOND2	Secondary O2 Sensor Monitor Conditions Encountered Counts Bank 2

==== Service 09 PID 0B - In-use performance tracking for compression ignition engines ====
It provides information about track in-use performance for NMHC catalyst, NOx catalyst monitor, NOx adsorber monitor, PM filter monitor, exhaust gas sensor monitor, EGR/ VVT monitor, boost pressure monitor and fuel system monitor.

All data items consist of two bytes and are reported in this order (each message contains two items, hence message length is 4):

Mnemonic	Description
OBDCOND	OBD Monitoring Conditions Encountered Counts
IGNCNTR	Ignition Counter
HCCATCOMP	NMHC Catalyst Monitor Completion Condition Counts
HCCATCOND	NMHC Catalyst Monitor Conditions Encountered Counts
NCATCOMP	NOx/SCR Catalyst Monitor Completion Condition Counts
NCATCOND	NOx/SCR Catalyst Monitor Conditions Encountered Counts
NADSCOMP	NOx Adsorber Monitor Completion Condition Counts
NADSCOND	NOx Adsorber Monitor Conditions Encountered Counts
PMCOMP	PM Filter Monitor Completion Condition Counts
PMCOND	PM Filter Monitor Conditions Encountered Counts
EGSCOMP	Exhaust Gas Sensor Monitor Completion Condition Counts
EGSCOND	Exhaust Gas Sensor Monitor Conditions Encountered Counts
EGRCOMP	EGR and/or VVT Monitor Completion Condition Counts
EGRCOND	EGR and/or VVT Monitor Conditions Encountered Counts
BPCOMP	Boost Pressure Monitor Completion Condition Counts
BPCOND	Boost Pressure Monitor Conditions Encountered Counts
FUELCOMP	Fuel Monitor Completion Condition Counts
FUELCOND	Fuel Monitor Conditions Encountered Counts

=== Enumerated PIDs ===
Some PIDs are to be interpreted specially, and aren't necessarily exactly bitwise encoded, or in any scale. The values for these PIDs are enumerated.

==== Service 01 PID 03 - Fuel system status ====
A request for this PID returns 2 bytes of data. The first byte describes fuel system #1. The second byte describes fuel system #2 (if it exists) and is encoded identically to the first byte. The meaning assigned to the value of each byte is as follows:

Value	Description
0	The motor is off
1	Open loop due to insufficient engine temperature
2	Closed loop, using oxygen sensor feedback to determine fuel mix
4	Open loop due to engine load OR fuel cut due to deceleration
8	Open loop due to system failure
16	Closed loop, using at least one oxygen sensor but there is a fault in the feedback system

Any other value is an invalid response.

==== Service 01 PID 12 - Commanded secondary air status ====
A request for this PID returns a single byte of data which describes the secondary air status.

Value	Description
1	Upstream
2	Downstream of catalytic converter
4	From the outside atmosphere or off
8	Pump commanded on for diagnostics

Any other value is an invalid response.

==== Service 01 PID 1C - OBD standards this vehicle conforms to ====
A request for this PID returns a single byte of data which describes which OBD standards this ECU was designed to comply with. The different values the data byte can hold are shown below, next to what they mean:

Value (dec)	Description
1	OBD-II as defined by the CARB
2	OBD as defined by the EPA
3	OBD and OBD-II
4	OBD-I
5	Not OBD compliant
6	EOBD (Europe)
7	EOBD and OBD-II
8	EOBD and OBD
9	EOBD, OBD and OBD II
10	JOBD (Japan)
11	JOBD and OBD II
12	JOBD and EOBD
13	JOBD, EOBD, and OBD II
14	OBD, EOBD, and KOBD
15	OBD, OBD II, EOBD, and KOBD
16	Reserved
17	Engine Manufacturer Diagnostics (EMD)
18	Engine Manufacturer Diagnostics Enhanced (EMD+)
19	Heavy Duty On-Board Diagnostics (Child/Partial) (HD OBD-C)
20	Heavy Duty On-Board Diagnostics (HD OBD)
21	World Wide Harmonized OBD (WWH OBD)
22	Reserved
23	Heavy Duty Euro OBD Stage I without NOx control (HD EOBD-I)
24	Heavy Duty Euro OBD Stage I with NOx control (HD EOBD-I N)
25	Heavy Duty Euro OBD Stage II without NOx control (HD EOBD-II)
26	Heavy Duty Euro OBD Stage II with NOx control (HD EOBD-II N)
27	Heavy Duty ZEV
28	Brazil OBD Phase 1 (OBDBr-1)
29	Brazil OBD Phase 2 (OBDBr-2)
30	Korean OBD (KOBD)
31	India OBD I (IOBD I)
32	India OBD II (IOBD II)
33	Heavy Duty Euro OBD Stage VI (HD EOBD-IV)
34	OBD, OBD-II, and HD OBD
35	Brazil OBD Phase 3 (OBDBr-3)
53-250	Reserved
251-255	Not available for assignment (SAE J1939 special meaning)

==== Service 01 PID 51 - Fuel Type Coding ====
This PID returns a value from an enumerated list giving the fuel type of the vehicle. The fuel type is returned as a single byte, and the value is given by the following table:

Value	Description
0	Not available
1	Gasoline
2	Methanol
3	Ethanol
4	Diesel
5	LPG
6	CNG
7	Propane
8	Electric
9	Bifuel running Gasoline
10	Bifuel running Methanol
11	Bifuel running Ethanol
12	Bifuel running LPG
13	Bifuel running CNG
14	Bifuel running Propane
15	Bifuel running Electricity
16	Bifuel running electric and combustion engine
17	Hybrid gasoline
18	Hybrid Ethanol
19	Hybrid Diesel
20	Hybrid Electric
21	Hybrid running electric and combustion engine
22	Hybrid Regenerative
23	Bifuel running diesel

Any other value is reserved by ISO/SAE. There are currently no definitions for flexible-fuel vehicle.

== Non-standard PIDs ==
The majority of all OBD-II PIDs in use are non-standard. For most modern vehicles, there are many more functions supported on the OBD-II interface than are covered by the standard PIDs, and there is relatively minor overlap between vehicle manufacturers for these non-standard PIDs.

There is very limited information available in the public domain for non-standard PIDs. The primary source of information on non-standard PIDs across different manufacturers is maintained by the US-based Equipment and Tool Institute and only available to members. The price of ETI membership for access to scan codes varies based on company size defined by annual sales of automotive tools and equipment in North America:

Annual Sales in North America	Annual Dues
Under $10,000,000	$5,000
$10,000,000 - $50,000,000	$7,500
Greater than $50,000,000	$10,000

However, even ETI membership will not provide full documentation for non-standard PIDs. ETI states:

Some OEMs refuse to use ETI as a one-stop source of scan tool information. They prefer to do business with each tool company separately. These companies also require that you enter into a contract with them. The charges vary but here is a snapshot as of April 13th, 2015 of the per year charges:

GM	$50,000
Honda	$5,000
Suzuki	$1,000
BMW	$25,500 plus $2,000 per update. Updates occur annually.

== CAN (11-bit) bus format ==
As defined in ISO 15765-4, emissions protocols (including OBD-II, EOBD, UDS, etc.) use the ISO-TP transport layer (ISO 15765-2). All CAN frames sent using ISO-TP use a data length of 8 bytes (and DLC of 8). It is recommended to pad the unused data bytes with 0xCC.

The PID query and response occurs on the vehicle's CAN bus. Standard OBD requests and responses use functional addresses. The diagnostic reader initiates a query using CAN ID 7DFh, which acts as a broadcast address, and accepts responses from any ID in the range 7E8h to 7EFh. ECUs that can respond to OBD queries listen both to the functional broadcast ID of 7DFh and one assigned ID in the range 7E0h to 7E7h. Their response has an ID of their assigned ID plus 8 e.g. 7E8h through 7EFh.

This approach allows up to eight ECUs, each independently responding to OBD queries. The diagnostic reader can use the ID in the ECU response frame to continue communication with a specific ECU. In particular, multi-frame communication requires a response to the specific ECU ID rather than to ID 7DFh.

CAN bus may also be used for communication beyond the standard OBD messages. Physical addressing uses particular CAN IDs for specific modules (e.g., 720h for the instrument cluster in Fords) with proprietary frame payloads.

=== Query ===
The functional PID query is sent to the vehicle on the CAN bus at ID 7DFh, using 8 data bytes. The bytes are:

	Byte							
PID Type	0	1	2	3	4	5	6	7
SAE Standard	Number of additional data bytes: 2	Service; 01 = show current data; 02 = freeze frame; etc.	PID code (e.g.: 05 = Engine coolant temperature)	not used (ISO 15765-2 suggests CCh)				
Vehicle specific	Number of additional data bytes: 3	Custom service: (e.g.: 22 = enhanced data)	PID code (e.g.: 4980h)		not used (ISO 15765-2 suggests CCh)			

=== Response ===
The vehicle responds to the PID query on the CAN bus with message IDs that depend on which module responded. Typically the engine or main ECU responds at ID 7E8h. Other modules, like the hybrid controller or battery controller in a Prius, respond at 07E9h, 07EAh, 07EBh, etc. These are 8h higher than the physical address the module responds to. Even though the number of bytes in the returned value is variable, the message uses 8 data bytes regardless (CAN bus protocol form Frameformat with 8 data bytes). The bytes are:

	Byte							
CAN Address	0	1	2	3	4	5	6	7
SAE Standard; 7E8h, 7E9h, 7EAh, etc.	Number of additional data bytes: 3 to 6	Custom service Same as query, except that 40h is added to the service value. So: 41h = show current data; 42h = freeze frame; etc.	PID code (e.g.: 05 = Engine coolant temperature)	value of the specified parameter, byte 0	value, byte 1 (optional)	value, byte 2 (optional)	value, byte 3 (optional)	not used (may be 00h or 55h)
Vehicle specific 7E8h, or 8h + physical ID of module.	Number of additional data bytes: 4to 7	Custom service: same as query, except that 40h is added to the service value.(e.g.: 62h = response to service 22h request)	PID code (e.g.: 4980h)		value of the specified parameter, byte 0	value, byte 1 (optional)	value, byte 2 (optional)	value, byte 3 (optional)
Vehicle specific 7E8h, or 8h + physical ID of module.	Number of additional data bytes: 3	7Fh this a general response usually indicating the module doesn't recognize the request.	Custom service: (e.g.: 22h = enhanced diagnostic data by PID, 21h = enhanced data by offset)	31h	not used (may be 00h)			

== See also ==
- Engine control unit
- ELM327, a very common microcontroller (silicon chip) and multi-protocol interpreter used in OBD-II vehicle communication interfaces
- Unified Diagnostic Services, the ISO standard
