= Passthrough device =

Automotive technology

J2534
- Passthrough device (J2534-1)
- Status: Published
- Latest version: 05.00; 2022-01
- Organization: SAE International
- Website: www.sae.org/standards/j2534-1_5_00-recommended-practice-pass-thru-vehicle-programming

A passthrough device is a device used in conjunction with a computer to reprogram vehicle control modules through the OBD-II/CANbus port. Each manufacturer has their own type, but SAE International standardized the J2534 universal requirements in 2004, requiring all manufacturers to allow vehicles sold in the United States of America and Europe to accept powertrain reprogramming through specific universal parameters.
