= Data link connector =

Multi-pin diagnostic connection port

The data link connector (DLC) is the multi-pin diagnostic connection port for automobiles, trucks, and motorcycles used to interface a scan tool with the control modules of a given vehicle and access on-board diagnostics and live data streams.

Prior to 1996, many OBD-I data link connectors were in the engine compartment, usually near the fuse block. Also, prior to 1996, there was no standardization for these connectors, and each manufacturer had its own shape with a unique pin arrangement. After 1996, many manufacturers retained their proprietary connectors in addition to the OBD-II interface, because OBD-II ports are only required to transmit emission-related codes and data.

J1708 is a DLC used on heavy duty vehicles.

== OBD-II diagnostic connector ==
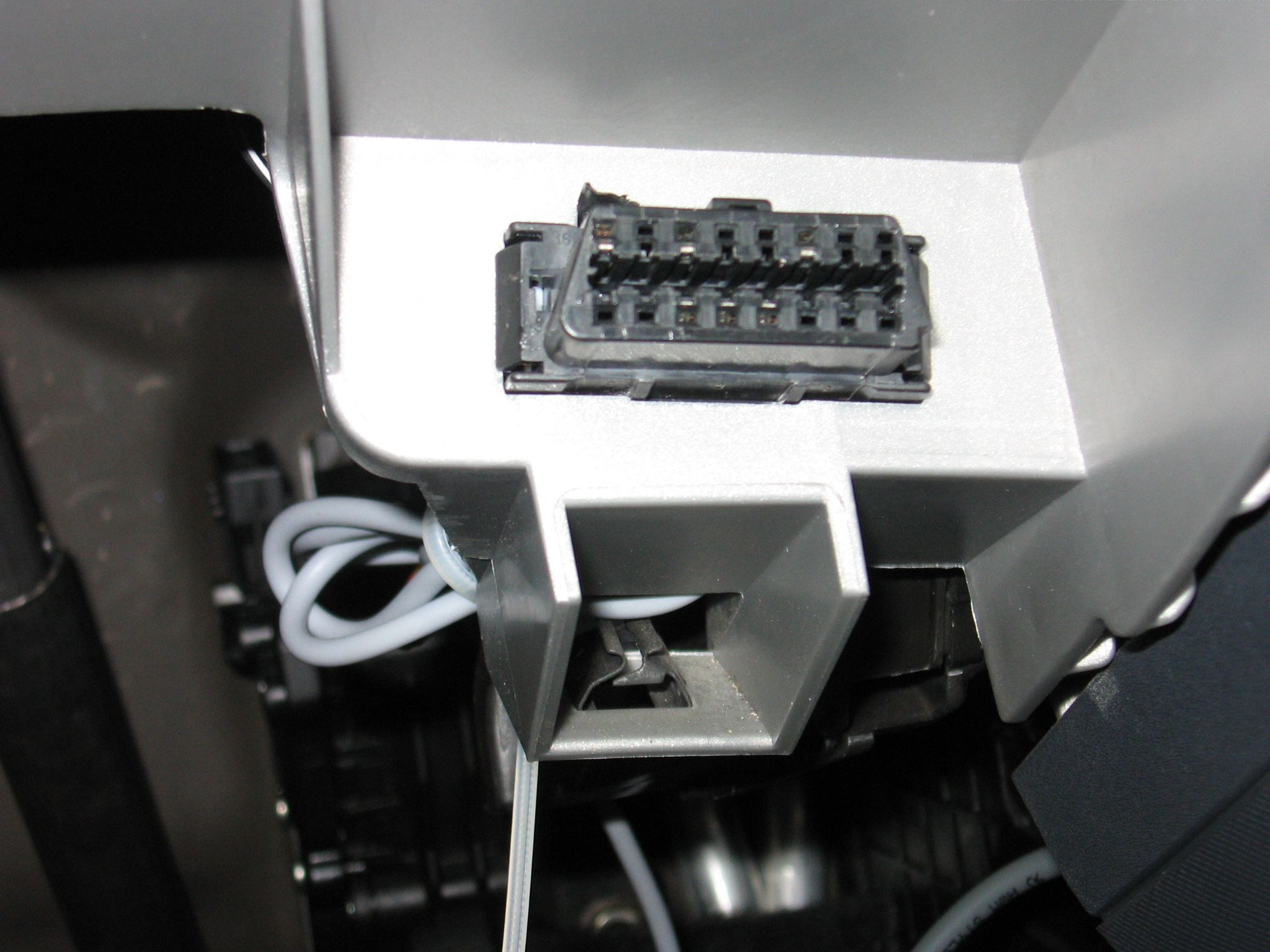
Female OBD-II connector on a car

Type A female connector

Type B female connector

The OBD-II DLC (post-1996 vehicles) is usually located under the instrument panel on the driver side, though there are several exceptions. The SAE J1962 specification provides for two standardized hardware interfaces, called type A and type B. Both are female, 16-pin (2x8), D-shaped connectors, and both have a groove between the two rows of pins. But type B has the groove interrupted in the middle, so it isn't possible to plug a type A male connector into a type B socket. It is possible, however, to mate a type B male plug in a type A female socket.

The type A connector is used for vehicles that use 12V supply voltage, whereas type B is used for 24V vehicles and it is required to mark the front of the D-shaped area in blue color.

The OBD-II connector is required to be within 2 feet (0.61 m) of the steering wheel or, if the manufacturer has applied for an exemption, at least somewhere within reach of the driver.

== See also ==
- On-board diagnostics
- OBD-II PIDs – list of data readable with a scan tool
- ELM327 – common integrated circuit inside scan tools
- OBDuino – onboard computer made with Arduino that has the scan tool functions
