= Vehicle bus =

Communications network for vehicle components

A vehicle bus is a specialized internal communications network that interconnects components inside a vehicle (e.g., automobile, bus, train, industrial or agricultural vehicle, ship, or aircraft). In electronics, a bus is simply a device that connects multiple electrical or electronic devices together. Special requirements for vehicle control such as assurance of message delivery, of non-conflicting messages, of minimum time of delivery, of low cost, and of EMF noise resilience, as well as redundant routing and other characteristics mandate the use of less common networking protocols. Protocols include Controller Area Network (CAN), Local Interconnect Network (LIN) and others. Conventional computer networking technologies (such as Ethernet and TCP/IP) are rarely used, except in aircraft, where implementations of the ARINC 664 such as the Avionics Full-Duplex Switched Ethernet are used. Aircraft that use Avionics Full-Duplex Switched Ethernet (AFDX) include the Boeing 787, the Airbus A400M and the Airbus A380. Trains commonly use Ethernet Consist Network (ECN). All cars sold in the United States since 1996 are required to have an On-Board Diagnostics connector, for access to the car's electronic controllers.

== Background ==
The main driving forces for the development of vehicle network technology have been the advances made in the electronics industry in general and government regulations imposed, especially in the United States, in order to make the automobiles environmentally friendly.

With stringent emission standards for automobiles, it became impossible to attain the required degree of control without the help of on-board computing devices. On-board electronic devices have also contributed substantially to vehicle performance, occupant comfort, ease of manufacture and cost effectiveness.

At one time, a car radio was likely the only electronic device in an automobile, but now almost every component of the vehicle has some electronic feature. Typical electronic modules on today's vehicles include the Engine Control Unit (ECU), the Transmission Control Unit (TCU), the Anti-lock Braking System (ABS) and body control modules (BCM).

An electronic control module typically gets its input from sensors (speed, temperature, pressure, etc.) that it uses in its computation. Various actuators are used to enforce the actions determined by the module (turn the cooling fan on, change gear, etc.). The modules need to exchange data among themselves during the normal operation of the vehicle. For example, the engine needs to tell the transmission what the engine speed is, and the transmission needs to tell other modules when a gear shift occurs. This need to exchange data quickly and reliably led to the development of the vehicle network, as the medium of data exchange.

The automotive industry quickly realized the complexity of wiring each module to every other module. Such a wiring design would not only be complex, it would have to be altered depending on which modules were included in the specific vehicle. For example, a car without the anti-lock brake module would have to be wired differently than one that included anti-lock brakes.

The industry's answer to this problem was to create a central network in the vehicle. Modules could be 'plugged' into the network and would be able to communicate with any other module that was installed on the network. This design was easier to manufacture, easier to maintain and provided the flexibility to add and remove options without affecting the entire vehicle's wiring architecture. Each module, a node on the vehicle network, controls specific components related to its function and communicates with the other modules as necessary, using a standard protocol, over the vehicle network.

Networks were not new, but their application to the vehicle was. The networks for the vehicles called for:

- Low cost
- Immunity from external noise
- Ability to operate in harsh environments
- Overall robustness and reliability

Although the vehicle network made modest demands on data throughput, the demand for more on-board computing is continuing to drive changes to these networks to provide higher-speed communication between modules. The control area network include the receiver and transmitter for the host to controller transmission and interlinking between the computers

== Protocols, physical media and connectors ==
There are several network types and protocols used in vehicles by various manufactures. Many companies are encouraging a standard communication protocol, but one has not been settled on.

=== Protocols ===
Common vehicle buses protocols include:

- A²B - (Automotive Audio Bus) An audio distribution protocol developed by Analog Devices
- AFDX
- ARINC 429
- Byteflight
- CAN – (Controller Area Network) an inexpensive low-speed serial bus for interconnecting automotive components
- D2B – (Domestic Digital Bus) a high-speed multimedia interface
- FlexRay – a general purpose high-speed protocol with safety-critical features
- IDB-1394
- IEBus
- I²C
- ISO 9141-1/-2
- J1708 and J1587
- J1850
- J1939 and ISO 11783 – an adaptation of CAN for commercial (J1939) and agricultural (ISO 11783) vehicles
- Keyword Protocol 2000 (KWP2000) – a protocol for automotive diagnostic devices (runs either on a serial line or over CAN)
- LIN – (Local Interconnect Network) a very low cost in-vehicle sub-network
- MOST – (Media Oriented Systems Transport) a high-speed multimedia interface
- Multifunction Vehicle Bus – part of the Train Communication Network IEC 61375.
- SMARTwireX
- SPI
- VAN – (Vehicle Area Network)
- UAVCAN – (Uncomplicated Application-level Vehicular Communication And Networking) mostly used in electric aircraft, drones, satellites, and robotics.

=== Physical transmission media ===
Some examples of physical transmission media use in vehicle networks:

- Single wire
- Twisted Pair
- Fibre optic
- IEEE 1394
- MIL-STD-1553, developed for use in military avionics, it is now widely used in spacecraft too. Adopted for the MiG-35.
- MIL-STD-1773, roughly MIL-STD-1553 with optic cabling
- Power-line communication

=== Connectors ===
- OBD-2 (16 pin)

Additionally, many major car manufacturers use their own proprietary vehicle bus standards, or overlay proprietary messages over open protocols such as CAN.

- J1939 (9 pin)

Commercial class vehicles have Type-I or Type-II connectors that support CAN based communication per the SAE J1939 protocol.

== Protocols usage ==
Vehicle Messaging Protocols
| Protocol/Version | Start/End Year | Manufacturer | Vehicle Types |
|---|---|---|---|
| FlexRay | 2008? | BMW | cars |
| FlexRay | 2008? | Volkswagen | cars |
| FlexRay | 2008? | Daimler AG | cars |
| FlexRay | — | General Motors | cars |
| CAN | 1986 | Bosch | many |
| MOST | ? | Ford, BMW, Daimler, and GM | cars |
| J1850 | — | GM | cars |
| J1850 | 2008? | Chrysler | cars |
| J1850 | — | Ford | cars |
| APC | — | Ford | cars |
| ISO-9141-I/-II | 2008? | Ford | cars |
| VAN | 2000? | PSA Peugeot Citroën | cars |
| VAN | 2008? | Renault | cars |
| J1939 | 2005–present | many | heavy trucks (Class 5–8) |
| J1708/1587 | 1985–present | Volvo AB, most US truck manufacturers | heavy trucks (Class 5–8) |
