= FMS-Standard =

The Fleet Management Systems Interface (FMS) is a standard interface to vehicle data of commercial vehicles. The six European manufacturers Mercedes-Benz, MAN, Scania, Volvo (including Renault), DAF and Iveco developed the so-called FMS-Standard in 2002 to make manufacturer-independent applications for telematics possible.

The following data are broadcast at the FMS interface:

- Vehicle improvement (all round)
- Vehicle speed (wheel based)
- Vehicle speed (from tachograph)
- Clutch switch (on/off)
- Brake switch (on/off)
- Cruise control (on/off)
- PTO (Status/Mode)
- Accelerator pedal position (0–100%)
- Total fuel used (litres since lifetime)
- Fuel level (0–100%)
- Engine speed
- Gross axle weight rating (kg)
- Total engine hours (h)
- FMS-Standard software version (supported modes)
- Vehicle identification number (ASCII)
- Tachograph information
- High-resolution vehicle distance
- Service distance
- Engine coolant temperature

The data are coded according to SAE J1939. The repetition rate of the data is between 20 ms (e.g. engine speed) and 10 seconds (e.g. vehicle identification number).

With the FMS standard it is now possible to have manufacturer independent applications and evaluations of the data.

According to a note from the truck manufacturers, the FMS standard is seen as a worldwide standard. A direct connection to the internal vehicle bus system is not permitted by the truck manufacturers and could lead to the loss of warranty. Meanwhile, some manufacturers are quite restrictive in their workshops and cut all unknown connections to the internal bus system.

According to ACEA ca. 160,000 vehicles were fitted with an FMS standard interface in 2007. By 2019, more than 400,000 trucks use FMS in North America.

The FMS-Standard was also the base for the Bus-FMS-Standard for buses and coaches which was published in the year 2004.
