= Brake-by-wire =

Automotive technology

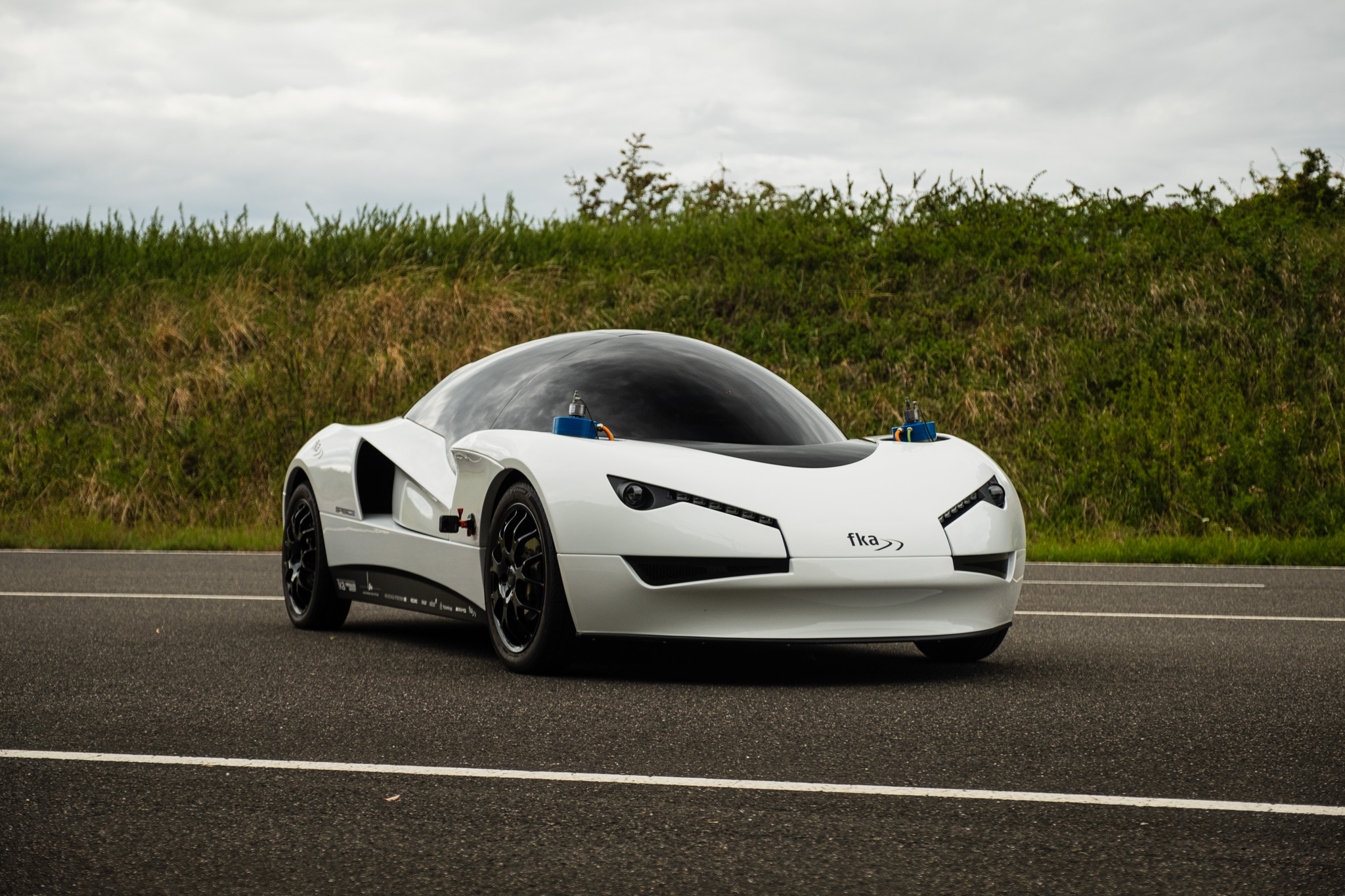
SpeedE, an academic concept car developed for studying drive-by-wire technologies such as brake-by-wire

Brake-by-wire technology in the automotive industry is the ability to control brakes through electronic means, without a mechanical connection that transfers force to the physical braking system from a driver input apparatus such as a pedal or lever.

The three main types of brake-by-wire systems are: electronic parking brakes which have, since the turn of the 21st century, become more common; electro-hydraulic brakes (EHB) which can be implemented alongside legacy hydraulic brakes and as of 2020 have found small-scale usage in the automotive industry; and electro-mechanical brakes (EMB) that use no hydraulic fluid, which as of 2020 have yet to be successfully introduced in production vehicles.

Electro-hydraulic braking systems control or boost the pressure applied to the hydraulic pumps through the brake pedal. Safety requires that the system remains fail-operational in the event of a power failure or an electronic software or hardware fault. Traditionally this has been achieved by means of a mechanical linkage between the brake pedal and the brake master cylinder. With a mechanical linkage, the braking system still operates hydraulically via the pedal, whether or not electrical control is present. EHBs can be implemented by-wire, without legacy hydraulic systems and mechanical connections. In such a case, fail-operational redundancy is implemented, allowing the vehicle to brake even if some of the brake systems fail.

Electro-mechanical brakes offer the advantage of reduced braking system volume and weight, less maintenance, easier compatibility with active safety control systems, and absence of toxic braking fluid. Their novel actuation methods such as wedge brakes have kept them, as of 2020, from successfully being introduced in production vehicles.

Since by-wire systems have no mechanical linkages that would provide manual control over the brakes, they require fail-operational redundancy as specified by the ISO 26262 standard level D. Redundant power supplies, sensors, and communication networks are required.

== Implementations ==
=== Prevalence ===
Some x-by-wire technologies have already been installed on commercial vehicles such as steer-by-wire and throttle-by-wire. Brake-by-wire technology has been widely commercialized with the introduction of Battery Electric Vehicles and Hybrid Vehicles. The most widely used application by Toyota in the high volume Prius was preceded by the GM EV1, the Rav4 EV, and other EVs where the technology is required for regenerative braking. Ford, General Motors, and most other manufacturers use the same general design, with the exception of Honda, who designed a notably different design.

Brake-by-wire is used in most common hybrid and electric vehicles produced since 1998 including all Toyota, Ford, and General Motors Electric and hybrid models. The Toyota Synergy Drive and the Rav4 EV use a system where a modified ABS (antilock brake system) actuator is coupled with a special hydraulic brake master cylinder to create a hydraulic system, coupled with the brake control unit (computer). Ford's system is almost identical to the Toyota system, and the General Motors system uses different nomenclature for components while the operation is virtually identical.

=== Electro-hydraulic brakes ===
The hydraulic force generated by pressing the brake pedal is used only as a sensor input to the computer unless a catastrophic failure occurs including a loss of 12-volt electrical power. The brake actuator has an electric pump that provides the hydraulic pressure for the system, and valves to pressurize each wheel caliper to apply the friction brake when required by the system.

The system includes all of the complexity of a vehicle stability control system (VSC), antilock brake system (ABS), and the requirement to use the Regeneration Braking as the primary mode of slowing the vehicle unless the Traction Battery (high-voltage battery) state of charge is too high to accept the additional energy or a panic stop or ABS situation is detected by the system.

The sensors monitored as inputs for the brake system include the wheel speed sensors, traction battery state of charge, yaw sensor, brake pedal stroke sensor, steering wheel angle, hydraulic actuator pressure, hydraulic pressures of each wheel caliper circuit, and accelerator position. Other information and inputs are also monitored.

The standard or typical operation is as follows:

1. The vehicle operator presses the brake pedal
2. The master cylinder converts the brake pedal movement to hydraulic pressure
3. the stroke sensor measures the pedal movement to identify a "panic stop" condition
4. The pressure transducer provides the brake force desired.
5. The Brake Control Unit (computer) detects the inputs, and then checks the wheel speed sensors to determine vehicle speed, and to determine if a wheel lockup requires the ABS algorithm.
6. The Brake Control System then checks the yaw sensor, steering wheel angle, and state of charge of the traction battery.
7. If the speed of the vehicle is above about 7 MPH, the vehicle traction motor generator is used as a generator to convert the kinetic energy to electric power, and stores the energy in the battery. This slows the vehicle.
8. If the operator (driver) presses the brake pedal harder, the system will apply hydraulic friction brakes to increase brake force.
9. Once the vehicle speed drops below about 7 MPH, the hydraulic brake system will completely take over, as regenerative Braking does not work effectively.
10. If the yaw sensor detects vehicle yaw, the system will initiate vehicle stability algorithms and processes (VSC).
11. If the wheel speed sensors detect wheel lock-up, the system will initiate anti-lock algorithm (ABS).

=== EBS ===
Brake-by-wire exists on heavy duty commercial vehicles under the name Electronic Braking System (EBS). This system provides electronic activation of all braking system components including retarder and engine brake. EBS also supports trailers and communicates between the towing vehicle and trailer using the ISO 11992 protocol. The communication between trailer and towing vehicle shall be done through a specific connector dedicated to ABS/EBS following either ISO 7638-1 for 24 V systems or ISO 7638-2 for 12 V systems.

EBS still relies on compressed air for braking and is only controlling the air through valves which means that it is not depending on higher voltages used by the electromechanical or electrohydraulical brake systems where electric power also is used to apply the brake pressure.

EBS enhances the precision of the braking over conventional braking, which shortens the braking distance. The fall back of an EBS system in case of failure is to use the ordinary air brake control pressure, so even in the event of a failure of the electronics the vehicle shall be able to make a safe stop.

=== Electro-mechanical brakes ===
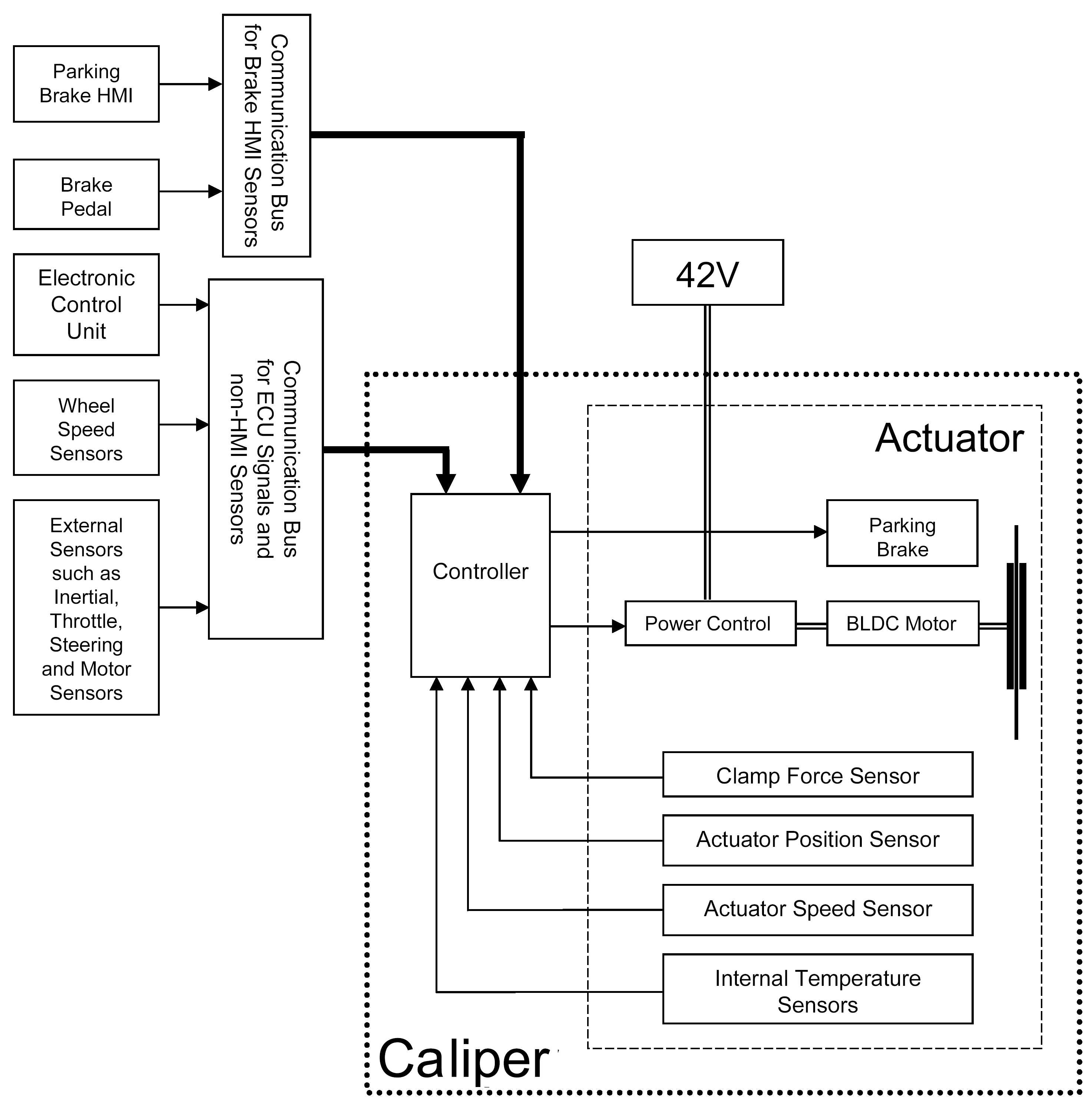
General architecture of an EMB system

General architecture of an electromechanical braking (EMB) system in a drive-by-wire car is shown in Fig. 1. The system mainly comprises five types of elements:

1. Processors including an electronic control unit (ECU) and other local processors
2. Memory (mainly integrated into the ECU)
3. Sensors
4. Actuators
5. Communication network(s).

Once the driver inputs a brake command to the system via a human–machine interface – HMI (e.g. the brake pedal), four independent brake commands are generated by the ECU based on high level brake functions such as anti-lock braking system (ABS) or vehicle stability control (VSC). These command signals are sent to the four electric calipers (e-calipers) via a communication network. As this network might not be able to properly communicate with the e-calipers due to network faults, HMI sensory data are also directly transmitted to each e-caliper via a separate data bus.

In each e-caliper a controller uses the brake command (received from ECU) as a reference input. The controller provides drive control commands for a power control module. This module controls three phase drive currents for the brake actuator which is a permanent magnet DC motor, energised by 42 V sources. In addition to tracking its reference brake command, the caliper controller also controls the position and speed of the brake actuator. Thus, two sensors are vitally required to measure the position and speed of the actuator in each e-caliper. Because of the safety critical nature of the application, even missing a limited number of samples of these sensory data should be compensated for.

==== Voting ====
A brake-by-wire system, by nature, is a safety critical system and therefore fault tolerance is a vitally important characteristic of this system. As a result, a brake-by-wire system is designed in such way that many of its essential information would be derived from a variety of sources (sensors) and be handled by more than the bare necessity hardware. Three main types of redundancy usually exist in a brake-by-wire system:

1. Redundant sensors in safety critical components such as the brake pedal.
2. Redundant copies of some signals that are of particular safety importance such as displacement and force measurements of the brake pedal copied by multiple processors in the pedal interface unit.
3. Redundant hardware to perform important processing tasks such as multiple processors for the ECU in Fig. 1.

To use the existing redundancy, voting algorithms need to be evaluated, modified and adopted to meet the stringent requirements of a brake-by-wire system. Reliability, fault tolerance and accuracy are the main targeted outcomes of the voting techniques that should be developed especially for redundancy resolution inside a brake-by-wire system.

Example of a solution for this problem: A fuzzy voter developed to fuse the information provided by three sensors devised in a brake pedal design.

==== Missing data compensation ====
In a brake-by-wire car, some sensors are safety-critical components, and their failure will disrupt the vehicle function and endanger human lives. Two examples are the brake pedal sensors and the wheel speed sensors. The electronic control unit must always be informed of the driver's intentions to brake or to stop the vehicle. Therefore, missing the pedal sensor data is a serious problem for functionality of the vehicle control system.

In the current brake-by-wire systems used in passenger and light truck vehicles, the system is designed to use existing sensors that have been proven to be dependable in brake system components and systems including ABS and VSC systems.

The highest potential risk for brake system failure has proven to be the Brake Control System software. Recurring failures have occurred in over 200 cases documented in NTSB documents. Because each manufacturer guards the confidentiality of their system design and software, there is no independent validation of the systems.

As of 2016 the NTSB has not directly investigated passenger car and light truck brake-by-wire vehicle accidents, and the manufacturers have taken the position that their vehicles are completely safe, and that all reported accidents are the result of "driver error".

Wheel speed data are also vital in a brake-by-wire system to avoid skidding. The design of a brake-by-wire car should provide safeguards against missing some of the data samples provided by the safety-critical sensors. Popular solutions are to provide redundant sensors and to apply a fail-safe mechanism. In addition to a complete sensor loss, the electronic control unit may also suffer an intermittent (temporary) data loss. For example, sensor data can sometimes fail to reach the electronic control unit. This may happen due to a temporary problem with the sensor itself or with the data transmission path. It may also result from an instantaneous short circuit or disconnection, a communication network fault, or a sudden increase in noise. In such cases, for a safe operation, the system has to be compensated for missing data samples.

Example of a solution for this problem: Missing data compensation by a predictive filter.

==== Accurate estimation of position and speed of brake actuators in the e-calipers ====
The caliper controller controls the position and speed of the brake actuator (besides its main task which is tracking of its reference brake command). Thus, position and speed sensors are vitally required in each e-caliper and an efficient design of a measurement mechanism to sense the position and speed of the actuator is required. Recent designs for brake-by-wire systems use resolvers to provide accurate and continuous measurements for both absolute position and speed of the rotor of the actuators. Incremental encoders are relative position sensors and their additive error needs to be calibrated or compensated for by different methods. Unlike the encoders, resolvers provide two output signals that always allow the detection of absolute angular position. In addition, they suppress common mode noise and are especially useful in a noisy environment. Because of these reasons, resolvers are usually applied for the purpose of position and speed measurement in brake-by-wire systems. However, nonlinear and robust observers are required to extract accurate position and speed estimates from the sinusoidal signals provided by resolvers.

Example of a solution for this problem: A hybrid resolver-to-digital conversion scheme with guaranteed robust stability and automatic calibration of the resolvers used in an EMB system.

==== Measurement and/or estimation of clamp force in the electromechanical calipers ====
A clamp force sensor is a relatively expensive component in an EMB caliper. The cost is derived from its high unit value from a supplier, as well as marked production expenses because of its inclusion. The later emanates from the complex assembly procedures dealing with small tolerances, as well as on-line calibration for performance variability from one clamp force sensor to another. The successful use of a clamp force sensor in an EMB system poses a challenging engineering task. If a clamp force sensor is placed close to a brake pad, then it will be subjected to severe temperature conditions reaching up to 800 Celsius that will challenge its mechanical integrity. Also temperature drifts must be compensated for. This situation can be avoided by embedding a clamp force sensor deep within the caliper. However, embedding this sensor leads to hysteresis that is influenced by friction between the clamp force sensor and the point of contact of an inner pad with the rotor. This hysteresis prevents a true clamp force to be measured. Due to the cost issues and engineering challenges involved with including the clamp force sensor, it might be desirable to eliminate this component from the EMB system. A potential opportunity to achieve this presents itself in accurate estimation of the clamp force based on alternative EMB system sensory measurements leading to the omission of a clamp force sensor.

Example of a solution for this problem: Clamp force estimation from actuator position and current measurements using sensor data fusion.

=== Electric parking brakes ===
Brake by wire is now a mature concept in its application to vehicle parking brakes. The electronic parking brake (EPB) was introduced in the early 2000s by BMW and Audi on their top line models (the 7 Series and A8 respectively) to dispense with the traditional cable operated system (operated via a lever between the seats or via a foot pedal) which commonly acted on the rear wheels of a car. EPBs, however, use a motorized mechanism built into the rear disc brake caliper, and is signalled via a switch on the centre console or dashboard. The electric parking brake is normally integrated with the vehicle's other systems via a CAN bus network, and can provide additional functionality such as:

- Automatic release of the parking brake upon moving off
- Automatic engagement of the parking brake whenever the vehicle is stopped on an incline – known as "Hold Assist"

EPB systems afford packaging and manufacturing advances, since it allows for an uncluttered central console in the absence of the traditional handbrake lever (many manufacturers have used the freed up space to place the controls for their infotainment systems), plus it reduces manufacturing complexity since it removes the need to route bowden cables underneath the vehicle.

EPB has gradually filtered down to cheaper vehicles, for instance within the Volkswagen Group, EPB became now a standard fitment on the 2006 Passat (B6), whilst Opel introduced it on the 2008 Insignia.

== See also ==
- Regenerative brake
- Drive-by-wire
- Fly-by-wire
