= Cyphal =

Vehicle communications protocol

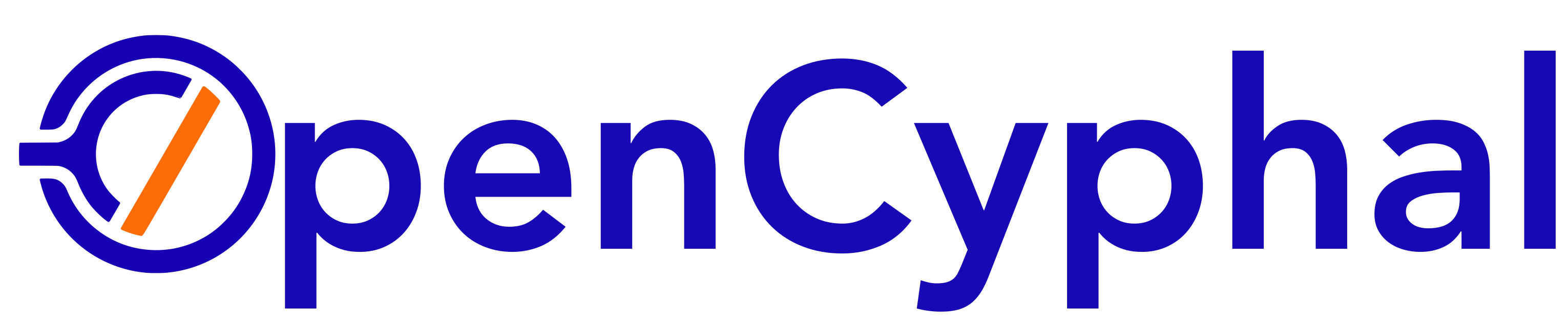

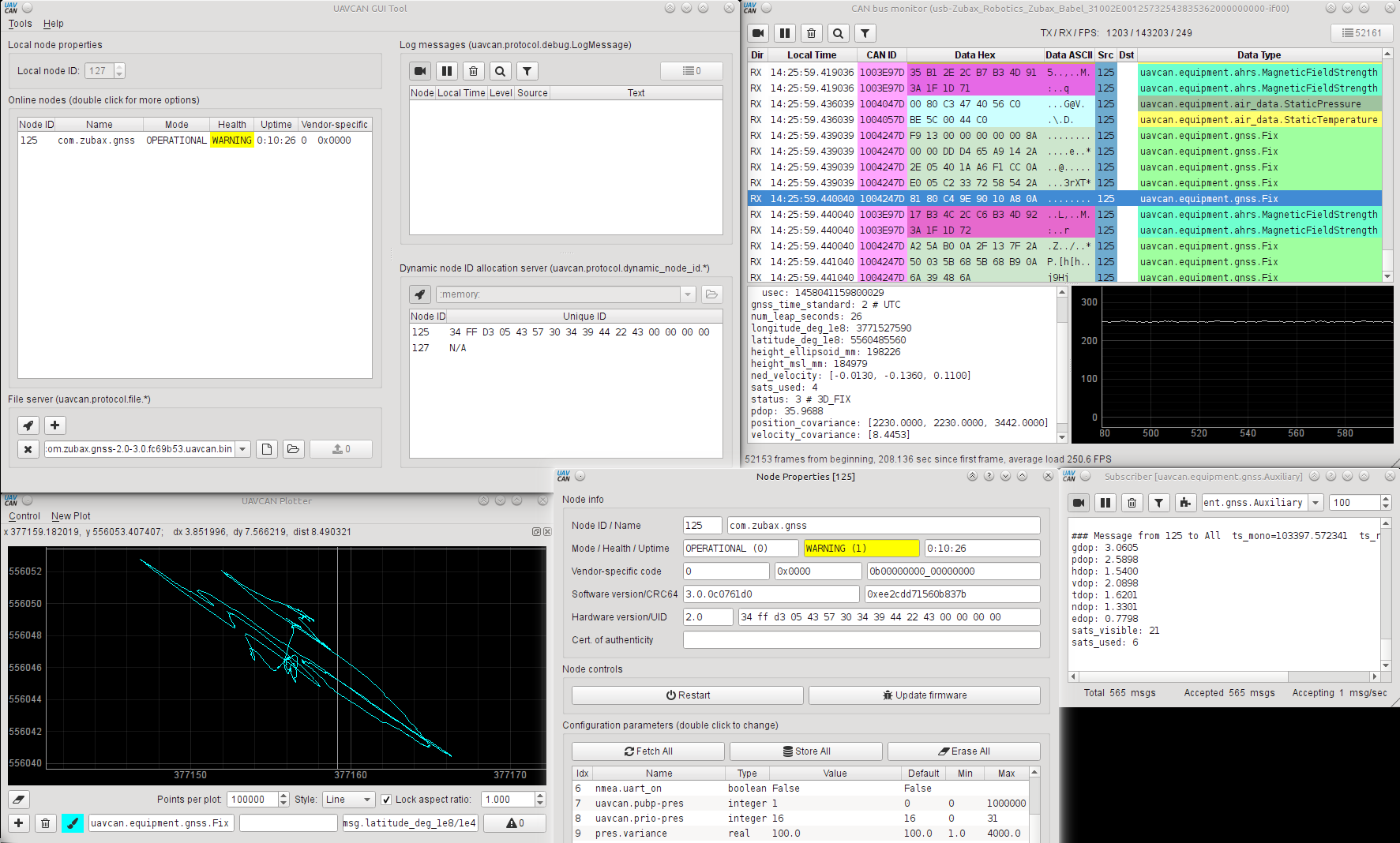
- Developer: Zubax Robotics / OpenCyphal Development Team
- Release: 2014
- Written in: C++, C, Python, Rust, JavaScript
- Operating system: Cross-platform
- License: MIT license
- Website: opencyphal.org
- Repository: https://github.com/OpenCyphal

Cyphal is a lightweight protocol designed for reliable intra-vehicle communications using various communications transports, originally destined for CAN bus, but targeting various network types in subsequent revisions. OpenCyphal is an open-source project that aims to provide MIT-licensed implementations of the Cyphal protocol. The project was known as UAVCAN (Uncomplicated Application-level Vehicular Computing and Networking) prior to rebranding in March 2022.

== History ==
The first RFC broadly outlining the general ideas that would later form the core design principles of Cyphal (branded UAVCAN at the time) was published in early 2014. It was a response to the perceived lack of adequate technology that could facilitate robust real-time intra-vehicular data exchange between distributed components of modern intelligent vehicles (primarily unmanned aircraft).

Since the original RFC, the protocol has been through three major design iterations, which culminated in the release of the first long-term stable revision in 2020 (6 years later) labelled UAVCAN v1.0. In the meantime, the protocol has been deployed in numerous diverse systems including unmanned aerial vehicles, spacecraft, underwater robots, racing cars, general robotic systems, and micromobility vehicles. In 2022, the protocol was rebranded as Cyphal.

Cyphal is positioned by its developers as a highly deterministic, safety-oriented alternative to high-level publish-subscribe frameworks such as DDS or the computation graph of ROS, which is sufficiently compact and simple to be usable in deeply embedded high-integrity applications. Cyphal has been shown to be usable with bare metal microcontrollers equipped with as little as 32K ROM and 8K RAM.

The protocol is open and can be reused freely without approval or licensing fees. The development of the core standard and its reference implementations is conducted in an open manner, coordinated via the public discussion forum. As of 2020, the project is supported by several major organizations including NXP Semiconductors and the Dronecode Project.

=== History of Cyphal in the context of other serial protocols ===
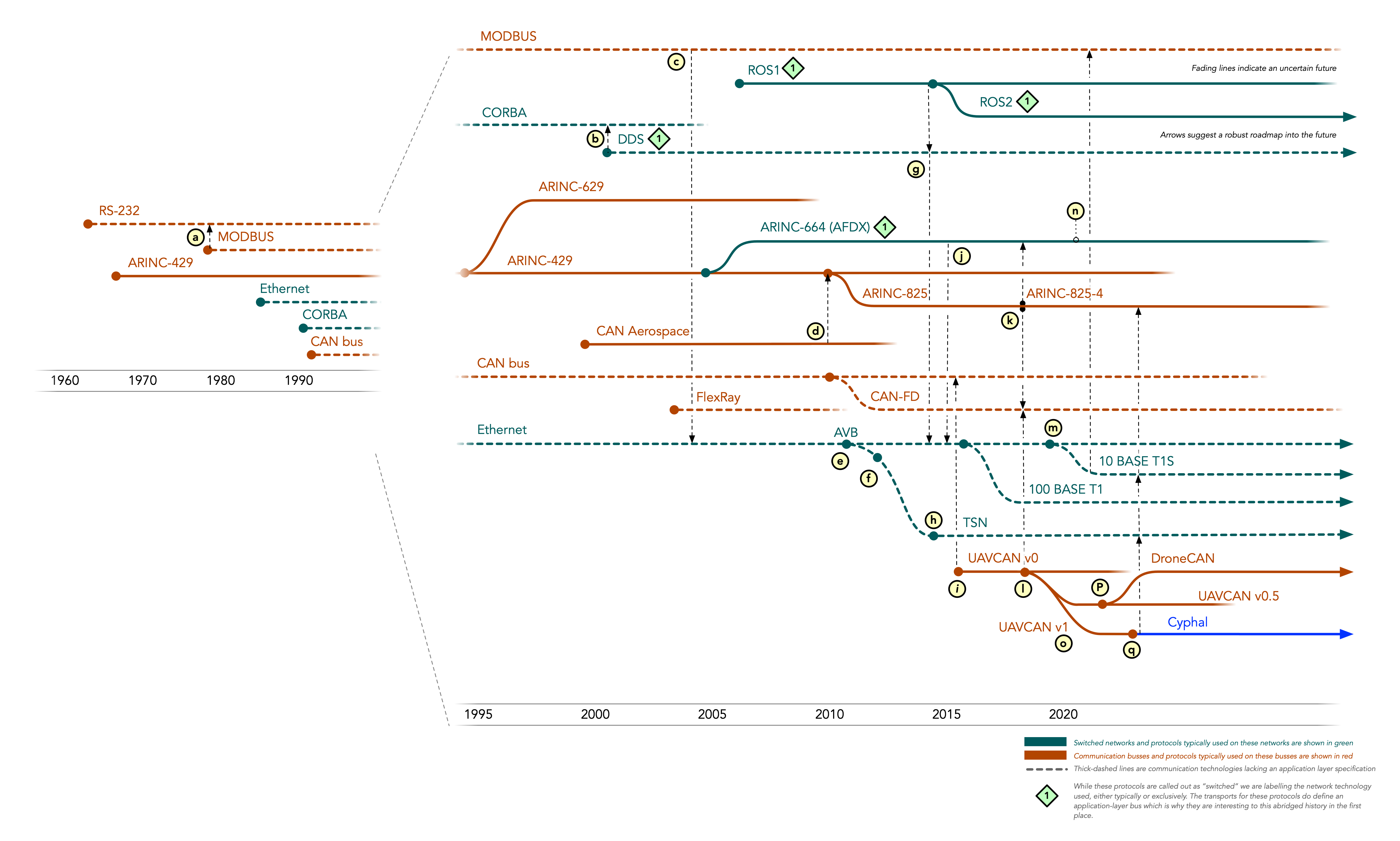

a. MODBUS often runs over RS-232.

b. DDS Borrows an Interface Definition Language from CORBA.

c. MODBUS over TCP port 502.

d. Airbus approaches ARINC to request a new CAN standard be developed. Michael Stock provides his experience developing CAN Aerospace. ARINC-825-1 is the result.

e. First AVB standard is published by the AVB Task Group of the IEEE 802.1 working group. IEEE1722-2011 is released.

f. The AVB Task Group is renamed the TSN Task Group.

g. ROS2 Builds on top of DDS. Typical media for distributed ROS2 systems is Ethernet.

h. 802.1Qbv and 802.1Qbu are released, enabling fully deterministic Ethernet networks to be defined.

i. Pavel Kirienko leads an open-source effort to define UAVCAN v0. Initially, it only supports CAN 2.0B.

j. Airbus gives a presentation to the IEEE, “Avionics Full Duplex Ethernet and the Time-Sensitive Networking Standard” which proposes incorporating AFDX into the TSN standards.

k. ARINC 825-4 adds support for CAN-FD and defines tunneling over ARINC-664.

l. Amazon Prime Air defines a minimal set of changes to v0 adding CAN-FD support. The unofficial variant is dubbed v0.5. At the same time, at the Stockholm Summit, UAVCAN v1 was conceived.

m. 10 BASE T1S is added to IEEE 802.3 defining half-duplex, two-wire, multi-drop Ethernet media with PLCA (PHY-Level Collision Avoidance). The specification is targeted at automotive and industrial use cases (e.g. MODBUS replacement).

n. Airbus A380 ends production.

o. UAVCAN v1 becomes beta.

p. DroneCAN takes over maintenance of the UAVCAN v0/v0.5 specification and advancement on top of it.

q. UAVCAN v1 is renamed Cyphal.

== Design ==
Cyphal provides zero-cost abstractions that are approachable and familiar to software engineers without compromising on functional safety and determinism. As a new technology, it is unencumbered by legacy and borrows heavily from recent developments in the field of general information technology. The protocol offers a stateless publish-subscribe communication model where a node can begin operation immediately upon connection to the network to accommodate high-integrity applications.

The protocol has two clearly separated major components: the transport layer that works on top of reliable vehicular networks such as Ethernet or CAN FD, and the transport-agnostic presentation (serialization) layer based on the so-called Data Structure Description Language (DSDL). The protocol has been shown to be implementable in less than 1000 logical lines of code.

DSDL is ideologically similar to the interface description language used in ROS, except that it introduces additional static constraints in order to render the solution suitable for real-time high-integrity embedded systems. The similarity prompted some developers to interface ROS with Cyphal using automated translation layers.

=== Core principles ===
The protocol is built around the following core design principles that are intended to ensure that the solution is well-suited for modern complex safety-critical vehicular systems.

- Democratic network — There is no master node. All nodes in the network have the same communication rights; there should be no single point of failure.
- Facilitation of functional safety — Cyphal system designers have the necessary guarantees and tools at their disposal to analyze the system and ensure its correct behavior.
- High-level communication abstractions — The protocol supports publish/subscribe and remote procedure call communication semantics with statically defined and statically verified data types (schema). The data types used for communication are defined in a clear and platform-agnostic way, that can be easily understood by both machines and humans.
- Facilitation of cross-vendor interoperability — Cyphal provides a common foundation that different vendors can build upon to ensure that their equipment is interoperable. Cyphal provides a generic set of standard application-agnostic communication data types.
- Well-defined generic high-level functions — Cyphal defines standard services and messages for common high-level functions, such as: network discovery, node configuration, node software update, node status monitoring, network-wide time synchronization, plug-and-play node support, etc.
- Atomic data abstractions — Nodes are able to exchange large data structures that exceed the capacity of a single transport frame. Cyphal performs automatic data decomposition and reassembly at the protocol level, hiding the related complexity from the application.
- High throughput, low latency, determinism — Cyphal adds very low overhead to the underlying transport protocol, which ensures high throughput and low latency. This makes Cyphal well-suited for hard real-time applications.
- Support for redundant interfaces and redundant nodes — Cyphal is suitable for applications that require modular redundancy.
- Simple logic, low computational requirements — Cyphal targets a wide variety of embedded systems, from high-performance on-board computers, to extremely resource-constrained microcontrollers. It is inexpensive to support in terms of computing power and engineering hours, and advanced features can be implemented incrementally as needed.
- Rich data type and interface abstractions — An interface description language is a core part of the technology, allowing deeply embedded subsystems to interface with higher-level systems directly (and in a maintainable manner), while enabling simulation and functional testing.
- Support for various transport protocols — Cyphal is usable with several different transports, and can be extended to support other transport protocols in the future.
- API-agnostic standard — Unlike some other networking standards, Cyphal does not attempt to describe the application program interface (API). Any details that do not affect the behavior of an implementation observable by other participants of the network are outside of the scope of the specification.
- Open specification and reference implementations — The Cyphal specification is, and will always be, open and free to use for everyone. The reference implementations are distributed under the terms of the permissive MIT License or released into the public domain.

=== Transport layer ===
==== Cyphal/CAN ====
The CAN transport is built on top of CAN and CAN FD using 29-bit identifiers. The CAN payload includes a fixed-size overhead of one byte per frame for the needs of the transport layer.

==== Cyphal/UDP ====
The Cyphal/UDP transport has been proposed for real-time Ethernet-based vehicular networks. The design is said to be influenced by AFDX, DDS/RTPS, and SOME/IP.

=== Standard data types ===
Like other similar technologies, Cyphal provides a library of common data types, managed and curated by the protocol maintainers, that are intended to address certain common issues in popular applications. These data types supplement vendor-specific or application-specific data types defined by adopters, much like a programming language would normally define a standard library to be relied upon by software developed by the user. The protocol specification provides a set of rules intended to avoid conflicts and enhance interoperability of data types defined by independent vendors.
