= ISO 11992 =

Digital information standard for trucking

ISO 11992 (Road vehicles — Interchange of digital information on electrical connections between towing and towed vehicles) is a CAN-based vehicle bus standard by the International Organization for Standardization. It is used for communication between the tractor and one or more trailers.

The protocol structure is similar to SAE J1939. The main differences are timing, bus voltage level, and the structure of the message's 29-bit identifier.
