= J1922 =

SAE protocol J1922 is a standard for "Powertrain Control Interface for Electronic Controls Used in Medium- and Heavy-Duty Diesel On-Highway Vehicle Applications" (published December 4, 2008). This SAE Recommended Practice provides a development or possibly interim production communication protocol between engine, transmission, ABS/traction control, and retarder systems until higher speed communication links are established.

== See also ==
- J1708
