= ISO 11783 =

Computer network protocol

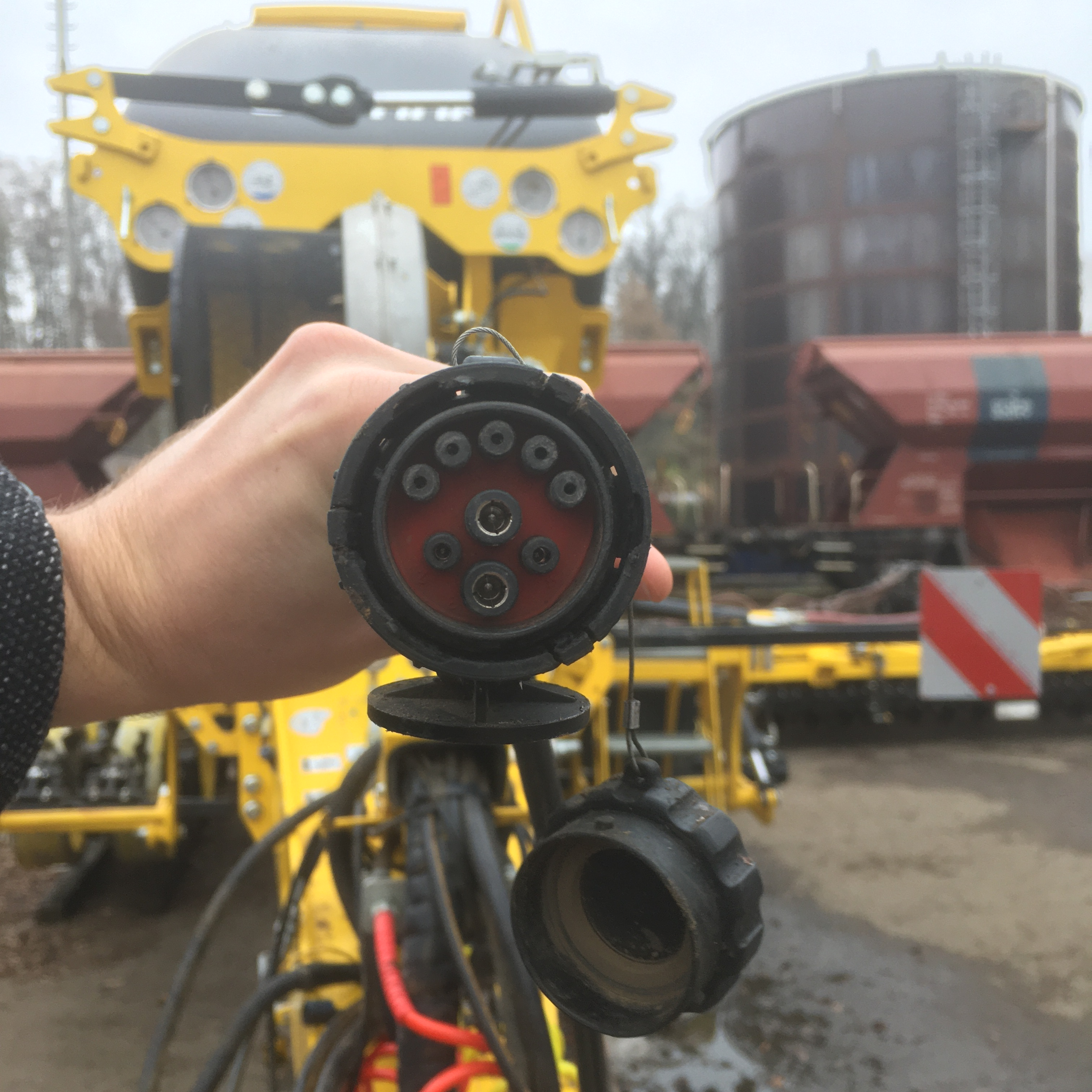
Agricultural implement ISOBUS plug

ISO 11783, known as Tractors and machinery for agriculture and forestry—Serial control and communications data network (commonly referred to as "ISOBUS") is a communication protocol for the agriculture industry based on, and harmonized with, the SAE J1939 protocol (which is based on the CAN bus).

Official maintenance of ISO 11783 is done by ISO TC 23 / SC 19 / WG 1 and WG5, however the Agricultural Industry Electronics Foundation (AEF) helps guide the ongoing direction of ISOBUS, organizes PlugFest events where many companies meet to test together, and provides formal ISOBUS conformance test tools.

The ISOBUS standard specifies a CAN network for control and communications on forestry or agricultural tractors and implements, although most usage is in the agricultural domain. It was noted as a widely used industry standard in 2019.

== Parts ==
The standard comes in 14 parts:

- ISO 11783-1: General standard for mobile data communication
- ISO 18883-2: Physical layer
- ISO 11783-3: Data link layer
- ISO 11783-4: Network layer
- ISO 11783-5: Network management - supporting plug-and-play changes to the network
- ISO 11783-6: Virtual terminal - a universal human machine interface for implement ECUs
- ISO 11783-7: Implement messages application layer - communication of signals (speeds, temperature, work-state, etc.)
- ISO 11783-8: Power train messages
- ISO 11783-9: Tractor ECU - a gateway between the open ISOBUS and the tractor private network, and power management for both a 15 A and a 55 A circuit.
- ISO 11783-10: Task controller and management information system data interchange - prescription application and data logging of implement operation.
- ISO 11783-11: Mobile data element dictionary - types of information being commanded and data logged (e.g. seeds per acre)
- ISO 11783-12: Diagnostics services - identification of devices and functionalities within those devices
- ISO 11783-13: File server - a network accessible location for storage and retrieval of data
- ISO 11783-14: Sequence control - the record, edit and playback of commanded sequences to offload the operator from as many repetitive tasks.

== Agricultural Industry Electronics Foundation and ISOBUS ==
The Agricultural Industry Electronics Foundation works to promote ISOBUS and coordinate enhanced certification tests for the ISO 11783 standard.
