= SAE J1708 =

Society of Automotive Engineers standard SAE J1708 is a standard used for serial communications between ECUs on a heavy duty vehicle and also between a computer and the vehicle. With respect to Open System Interconnection model (OSI), J1708 defines the physical layer. Common higher layer protocols that operate on top of J1708 are SAE J1587 and SAE J1922. The protocol is maintained by SAE International.

== Description ==
The standard defines a 2-wire 18 gauge wire cable that can run up to 130 feet (40 m) and operates at 9600 bit/s. A message is composed of up to 21 characters, unless the engine is stopped and the vehicle is not moving in which case transmitters are allowed to exceed the 21 byte max message length. Messages start with a Message ID (MID) character and finish with a checksum at the end. Characters are transmitted in the common 8N1 format.

The hardware utilized are RS-485 transceivers wired for open collector operation through the use of a pullup and pulldown of the separate data lines. Transmission is accomplished by controlling the driver enable pin of the transceiver. This method allows multiple devices to share the bus without the need for a single master node. Collisions are avoided by monitoring the bus while transmitting the MID to ensure that another node has not simultaneously transmitted a MID with a higher priority.

== History ==
SAE J1708, although still widely used, is replaced by SAE J1939 which is a CAN protocol.
