= Vehicle Area Network =

The Vehicle Area Network (VAN) is a vehicle bus developed by PSA Peugeot Citroën and Renault. It is a serial protocol capable of speeds up to 125 kbit/s and is standardised in ISO 11519-3.

At the media layer, VAN is a differential bus with dominant and recessive states signalling ones and zeros much like CAN bus. The data is encoded using enhanced Manchester which sets it apart from almost every other line signalling protocol. This encodes blocks of 4 bits as 3 non-return-to-zero encoded bits followed by 1 Manchester encoded bit.
