= Agricultural Industry Electronics Foundation =

International agricultural organization

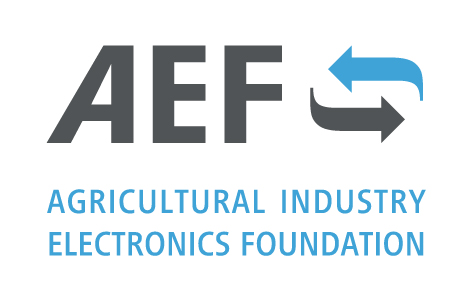

Agricultural Industry Electronics Foundation (AEF)

The Agricultural Industry Electronics Foundation (AEF) is a cross-manufacturer industry foundation established to support cooperation in agricultural electronics on a global scale. It was initiated on 28 October 2008 by seven agricultural equipment manufacturers and two associations. The AEF is associated with the development and implementation of ISOBUS, a standard intended to improve compatibility between tractors, implements, and user interfaces.

ISOBUS is based on ISO 11783, which defines data communication between agricultural and forestry machines and electronic components. The standard also covers communication relevant to safety on public roads.

Organisation

The AEF brings together member companies and institutions from different parts of the agricultural equipment industry. Its stated purpose is to improve interoperability and provide information on compatibility issues. The organisation has grown since its foundation in 2008 and now includes a large number of member companies and institutions worldwide.

The AEF ISOBUS Database allows users to check whether equipment is compatible and which functions are supported. Products can be entered into the database after an AEF Conformance Test. These tests are intended to verify that products support specific functions and comply with relevant ISO standards and AEF guidelines. Users can report compatibility issues through a ticket system.

Project groups

AEF guidelines and related functionalities are developed by representatives from member companies and associated development partners in project groups. These include Autonomy in Agriculture (AUT), the Agricultural Interoperability Network (AgIN), Wireless-Infield Communication (WIC), and Tractor Implement Management (TIM).

In agricultural applications, tractors and implements often need to exchange information while performing different tasks. TIM allows an implement or machine to control certain tractor functions within defined limits, such as operating speed or hydraulic flow. These functions may be relevant for automated tractor-implement combinations.

Milestones

The AEF’s milestones include:

· Vision Zero safety initiative award (2026).

· DLG Agrifuture Concept Winner for FieldDataSync / cooperative machines (2025).

· AE50 Award for the Agricultural Interoperability Network (AgIN) (2024).

· AE50 Award for Tractor Implement Management (TIM) (2020).

· Introduction of Tractor Implement Management (TIM) (2019).

· Prize for the AEF ISOBUS Database at Agritechnica 2013 or 2015.

· Introduction of AEF Conformance Testing to the market (2013).

· ISOBUS data bus standard (2002), based on ISO 11783.

Founding members

· AGCO

· AEM (Association of Equipment Manufacturers)

· CLAAS

· CNH Industrial

· Grimme

· John Deere

· Kverneland Group

· Pöttinger

· VDMA
