= Trailer connectors in Australia =

Australian standards

Symbol guide
- Example: Description
- Socket
- Pin

AUS Overview

A number of standards prevail in Australia and New Zealand for trailer connectors, the electrical connectors between vehicles and the trailers they tow that provide a means of control trailer lamps, and in one case, trailer brakes, and also sometimes, manufacturer-specific non-standard functions.

The Australian market generally uses its own version of the European connectors, as well as its uniquely own contacts.

The only connector used on the Australian market that is fully ISO standard conformant is the 7-pin ABS / EBS plug.

Since Australia has vehicles from both the North American market and the European market there is a mixture of 12V and 24V.

== 7-pin trailer connector (AS 4735) for heavy duty vehicles ==
7-pin trailer connector (AS 4735) for heavy duty vehicles (Towing vehicle side)

This connector is based on both SAE J560 and ISO 1185 and is providing either 12V, 7 x 40A or 24V, 7 x 20A. The voltage varies from vehicle to vehicle.

#	DIN	Signal	Colour	Rec. cross-section		Notes
#	DIN	Signal	Colour	mm²	AWG	Notes
1	31	Ground (-)	White	10	8	
2	58 or 58L	Clearance lamps/Outline marker lamps, Side marker lamps, identification lamps	Black	4	12	
3	L	Left Turn Signal	Yellow	4	12	
4	54	Stop lamps	Red	6	10	
5	R	Right Turn Signal	Green	4	12	
6	58 or 58R	Tail lamps, registration plate lamp	Brown	4	12	
7		Reversing lamps or +12V via ignition lock	Blue	6	10	

== Round trailer connectors Type 1 ==
Round trailer connectors Type 1

These connectors are based on ISO 1724 in 5-pin and 7-pin versions, but with some difference in the wiring.

=== Round 7-pin trailer connector Type 1 (AS 2513) ===
Round 7-pin trailer connector Type 1, Australian Standard 2513

In this pinout for an ISO 1724 connector, the position light pin is used for electric brakes (Pin 5, 58R), which means that if you connect a trailer with electric brakes to a towing vehicle wired according to ISO 1724 and turn on the position lights the trailer will be braking. Pin 2 (54G) is in the Australian wiring standard the reversing light, which is a minor problem.

#	DIN	Signal	Colour	Rec. cross-section		Notes
#	DIN	Signal	Colour	mm²	AWG	Notes
1	L	Left Turn Signal	Yellow	1.5	15	
2		Reversing lamps, control current to block surge brakes when reversing.	Black	1.5	15	
3	31	Ground connected to chassis	White	2.5	13	
4	R	Right Turn Signal	Green	1.5	15	
5		Electric brake control	Blue	1.5	15	
6	54	Stop lamps	Red	1.5	15	
7	58	Tail lamps, clearance lamps/outline marker lamps and registration plate lamp left side	Brown	1.5	15	

=== Round 5-pin trailer connector Type 1 ===
Round 5-pin trailer connector Type 1

This 5-pin connector has been superseded by the 7-pin (AS 2513), but can be found on older vehicles. Note that pins 1 and 4 are missing. Pin placement is identical to the 7-pin ISO 1724 with the absence of these pins. This means that you can connect a trailer with a 5-pin connector to a 7-pin socket or the other way around, but since the pins are wired in a different way the result may be far from what was expected.

#	DIN	Signal	Colour	Rec. cross-section		Notes
#	DIN	Signal	Colour	mm²	AWG	Notes
2	L	Left Turn Signal	Yellow	1.5	15	
3	31	Ground	White	2.5	13	
5	R	Right Turn Signal	Green	1.5	15	
6	54	Stop lamps	Red	1.5	15	
7	58	Tail lamps, clearance lamps/outline marker lamps and registration plate lamp	Brown	1.5	15	

== Round trailer socket type 2 ==
AUS Round trailer socket type 2

=== Round 7 pin trailer connector type 2 ===
Round 7 pin trailer connector type 2

#	DIN	Signal	Colour	Rec. cross-section		Notes
#	DIN	Signal	Colour	mm²	AWG	Notes
1	L	Left Turn Signal	Yellow	1.5	15	
2		Reversing lamps	Pink	1.5	15	
3	31	Ground	White	2.5	13	
4	R	Right Turn Signal	Green	1.5	15	
5		Electric brake control	Blue	1.5	15	
6	54	Stop lamps	Red	1.5	15	
7	58	Tail lamps, clearance lamps/outline marker lamps and registration plate lamp	Brown	1.5	15	

=== Round 6-pin trailer connector type 2 ===
Round 6-pin trailer connector type 2

#	DIN	Signal	Colour	Rec. cross-section		Notes
#	DIN	Signal	Colour	mm²	AWG	Notes
1	58	Tail lamps, clearance lamps/outline marker lamps and registration plate lamp right side	Brown	1.5	15	
2	L	Left Turn Signal	Yellow	1.5	15	
3	R	Right Turn Signal	Green	1.5	15	
4	54	Stop lamps	Red	1.5	15	
5		Electric brake control	Blue	1.5	15	
6	31	Ground (-) for pin 1 - 8	White	2.5	13	

== Rectangular trailer connectors Type 3 ==
Rectangular trailer connectors Type 3

#	DIN	Signal	Colour	Rec. cross-section		Notes
#	DIN	Signal	Colour	mm²	AWG	Notes
1	L	Left Turn Signal	Yellow	1.5	15	
2		Reversing lamps, control current to block surge brakes when reversing.	Black	1.5	15	
3	31	Ground	White	2.5	13	
4	R	Right Turn Signal	Green	1.5	15	
5		Electric brake control	Blue	1.5	15	
6	54	Stop lamps	Red	1.5	15	
7	58	Tail lamps, clearance lamps/outline marker lamps and registration plate lamp	Brown	1.5	15	
8	30	+12V permanent	Orange	2.5	13	
9	15	+12V via ignition lock	Pink	2.5	13	
10	31	Ground	White	2.5	13	
11		Rear fog lamps	Grey	1.5	15	
12		Spare	Purple	2.5	13	

The image of the 7 and 12 pin flat plugs are from the cable entry view (and possibly the images of the round connectors too). Please see reference [2] (VSB1 section 14) for front image. Reference [1] Narva wiring diagrams also have the diagrams cable entry view. If you want the front view images in colour see

Some trailer manufacturers will wire non-standard features through non-standard pins. Auxiliary power, breakaway sense or hydraulic brake pump should never be wired to pin 2, even if the trailer does not feature reverse lights.

== See also ==
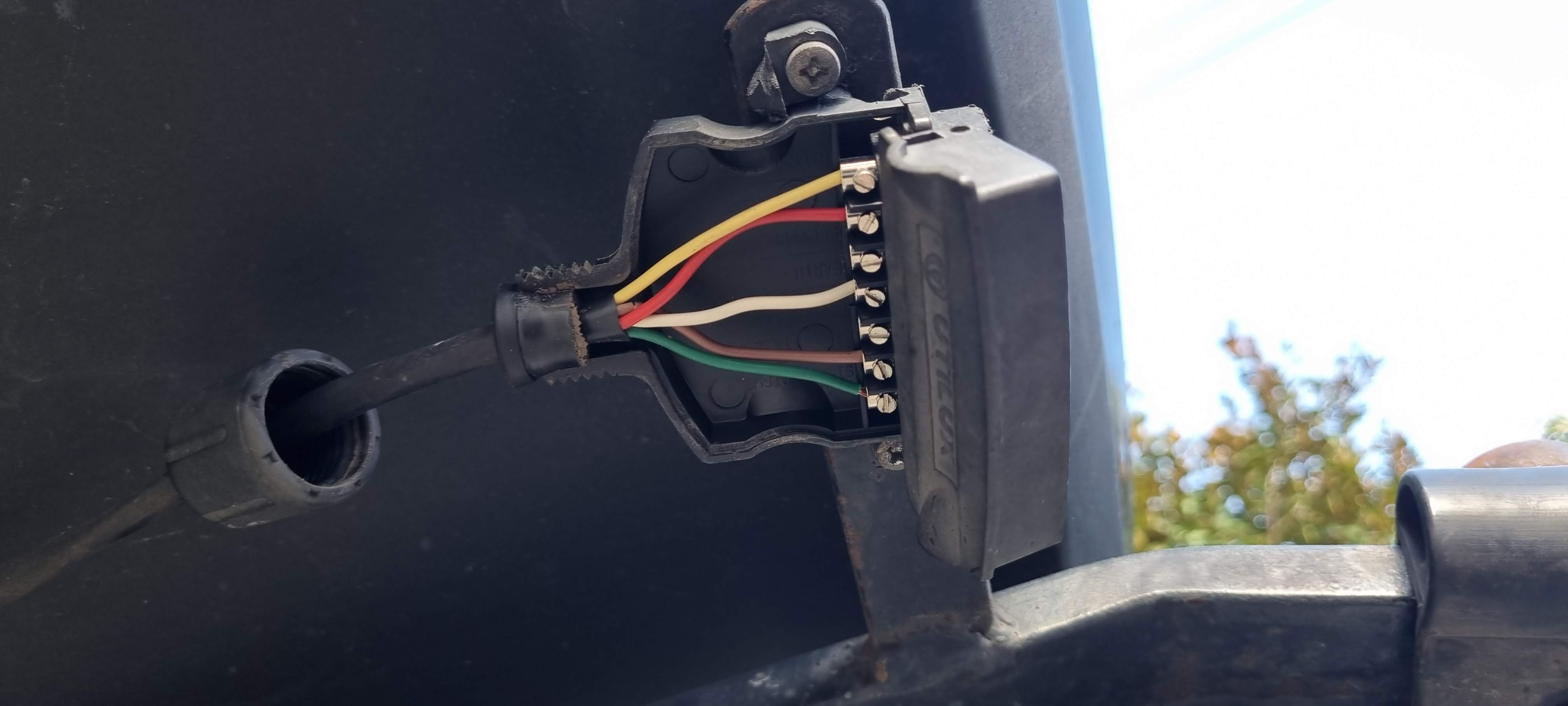
A 7-pin type 3 rectangular connector, viewed from beneath the vehicle.

- Trailer connector
- Trailer connectors in Europe
- ISO standards for trailer connectors
- Trailer connectors in North America
- Trailer connectors in military organizations
