= Tow hitch =

Hard attachment point on a road vehicle, used to tow a trailer

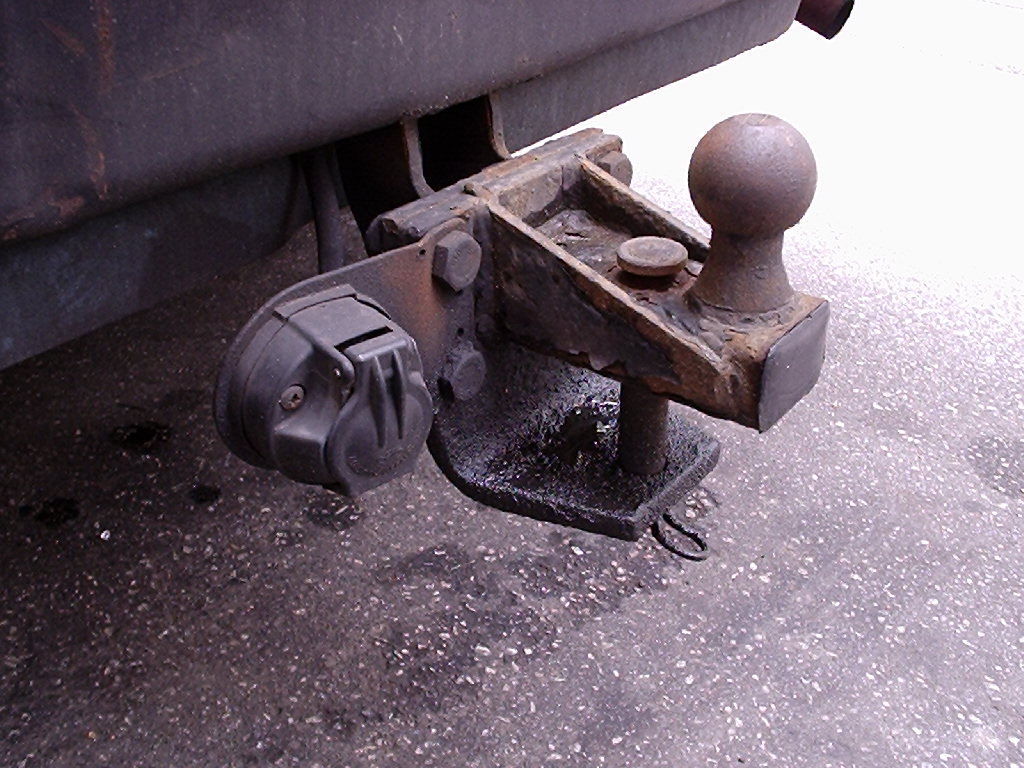
A tow ball mounted on the rear of a vehicle

A tow hitch (or tow bar or trailer hitch in North America) is a device attached to the chassis of a vehicle for towing, or a towbar to an aircraft nose gear. It can take the form of a tow ball to allow swiveling and articulation of a trailer, or a tow pin, or a tow hook with a trailer loop, often used for large or agricultural vehicles where slack in the pivot pin allows similar movements. Another category is the towing pintle used on military vehicles worldwide.

To tow safely, the correct combination of vehicle and trailer must be combined with correct loading horizontally and vertically on the tow ball.

== Regional variations ==
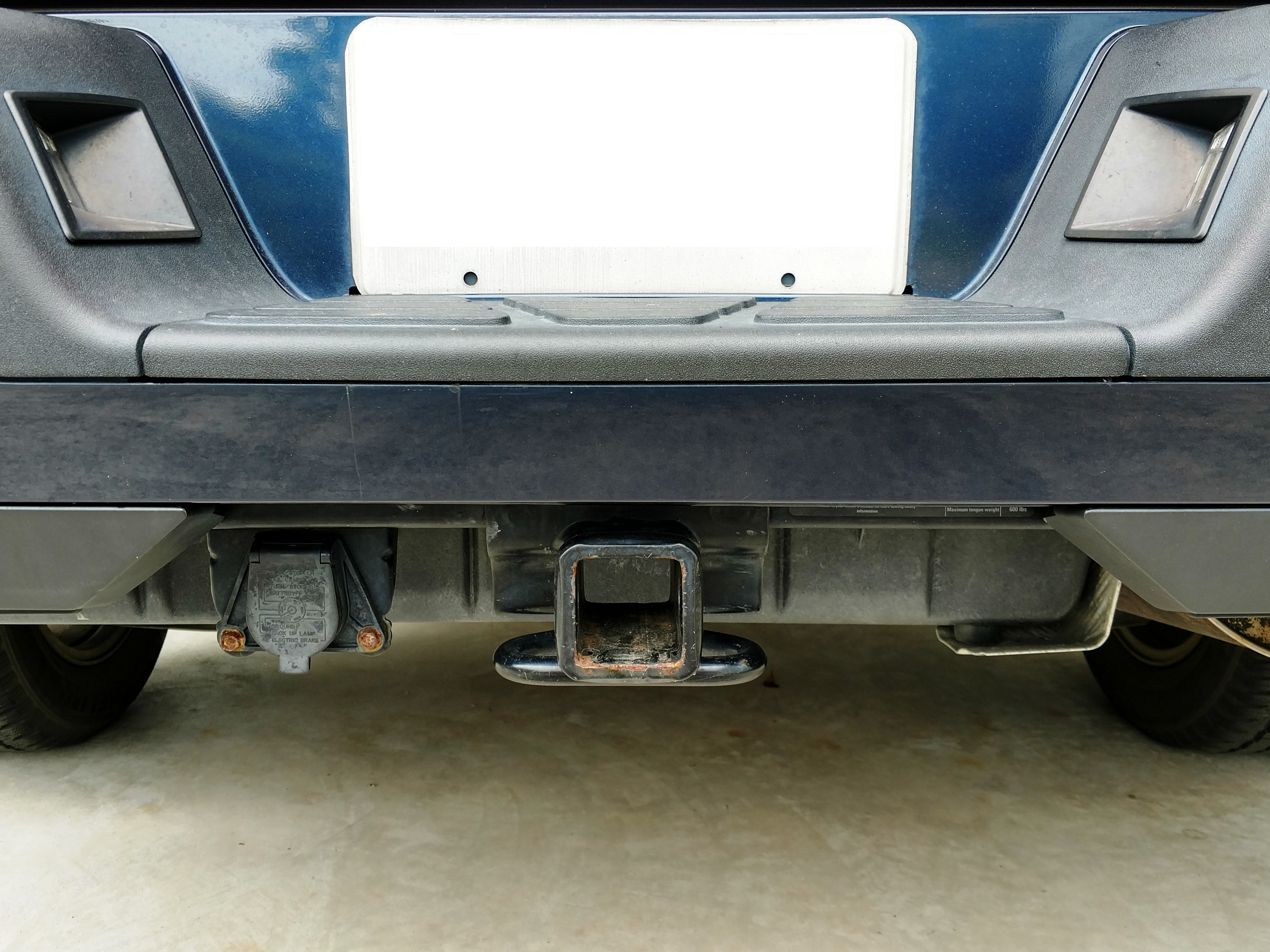
Under bumper class III receiver hitch with 7-pin blade trailer connector

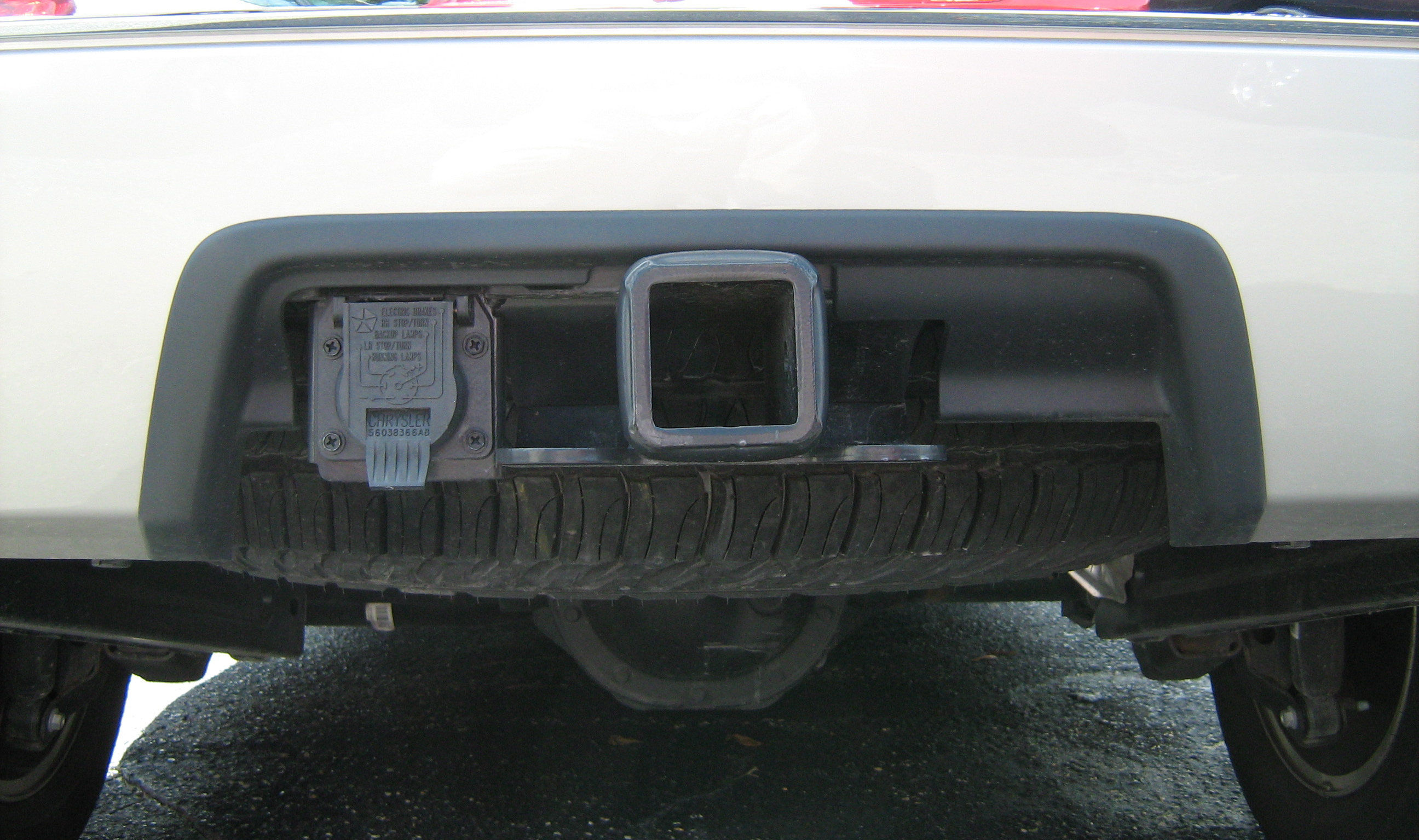
Class IV receiver for up to 10,000-pound (4.5 t) towing capacity with wiring connector on the left side

=== North America ===
Trailer hitches for conventional passenger cars, light-duty commercial vehicles, light trucks, and multipurpose passenger vehicles come in two main OEM or aftermarket types: receiver and bumper/fixed-drawbar.

Receiver-type hitches consist of a portion with a rearward-facing opening that accepts removable aftermarket hitch-mounted accessories: trailer hitch ball mounts, hitch bike racks, cargo carriers, etc.

Bumper/fixed-drawbar type hitches typically are built as one piece, have an integrated hole (sometimes more than one hole on pickup trucks) for the trailer ball mount, and are generally not compatible with aftermarket hitch-mounted accessories.

Outside North America, the vehicle mounting for the tow ball is called the tow bracket. The mounting points for all recent passenger vehicles are defined by the vehicle manufacturer and the tow-bracket manufacturer must use these mount points and prove the efficacy of their bracket for each vehicle by a full rig-based fatigue test.

==== Ball mounts ====
The trailer hitch ball attaches to a ball mount; with a diameter typically 1/16 inch (1.6 mm) larger than the ball bolt/shank diameter. The ball mount must match the SAE hitch class. The ballmount for a receiver-type hitch is a square bar that fits into a receiver attached to the vehicle. Removable ball mounts are offered with a varying rise or drop to accommodate variations in the height of the vehicle and trailer to provide for level towing.

==== Load classes ====
A trailer hitch typically bolts to the chassis of the vehicle. In North America, there are a few common trailer hitch classes (I, II, III, and IV) that are defined by the Society of Automotive Engineers (SAE).

Class I – up to 2,000 pounds (910 kg) – light loads
Class II – up to 3,500 pounds (1,600 kg) – light loads
Class III – up to 5,000 pounds (2,300 kg) – larger loads (campers, boats, etc.)
Class IV – up to 10,000 pounds (4,500 kg) – larger loads (campers, boats, etc.)

Some manufacturers market Class V hitches, but there was no such standard listed in the 2014 version of SAE J684.

"Class V" – up to 17,000 pounds (7,700 kg) – larger loads (construction equipment, etc.)

==== Receiver tube sizes ====
A receiver hitch can accommodate a variety of different tow hitches when the tow hook/ball may be attached via a receiver tube attached to the tow vehicle. Trailer hitch receiver tubes may be bolted, welded, or integral to the vehicle chassis, and come in various sizes depending on the load they are designed to carry and the country of operation. The US standards are:

- Class I and II: 1 1/4 in (31.8 mm) light or medium duty receiver tube
- Class III and IV: 2 in (50.8 mm) heavy duty receiver tube
- Class V: 2 or 2 1/2 in (50.8 or 63.5 mm) receiver tube

==== Ball sizes ====
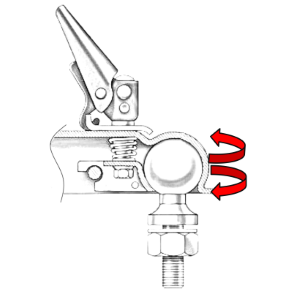
Operation of tow ball with trailer hitch mounted

Trailer hitch balls come in various sizes depending on the load they carry and the country of operation, with removable types consisting of a bolt/shank to attach to the ball mount. The trailer tongue (North America) or coupling (outside North America) slips over a trailer hitch ball attached to a receiver hitch mount or integral with the hitch.

A larger, heavy-duty gooseneck ball size: 3 in (76.2 mm) is typically used for towing greater than 10,000 pounds (4.5 t), and this towing capacity falls outside of the scope of SAE J684 trailer hitch classes.

Typical North American hitch ball sizes
Ball size	Bolt/shank diameter	Typical max capacity
1 7/8 in (47.6 mm)	3/4 in (19.1 mm)	2,000 lb (907 kg)
1 7/8 in (47.6 mm)	1 in (25.4 mm)	2,000 lb (907 kg)
2 in (50.8 mm)	3/4 in (19.1 mm)	3,500 lb (1,590 kg)
2 in (50.8 mm)	1 in (25.4 mm)	6,000 lb (2,720 kg)
2 in (50.8 mm)	1 1/4 in (31.8 mm)	6,000 lb (2,720 kg)
2 in (50.8 mm)	1 3/8 in (34.9 mm)	10,000 lb (4,540 kg)
2 5/16 in (58.7 mm)	1 in (25.4 mm)	6,000 lb (2,720 kg)
2 5/16 in (58.7 mm)	1 1/4 in (31.8 mm)	10,000 lb (4,540 kg)
3 in (76.2 mm)	2 in (50.8 mm)	>10,000 lb (4,540 kg)

==== Truck variants ====
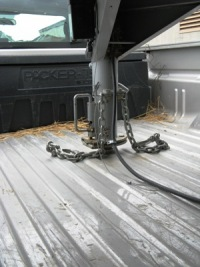
Heavy trailer mounted on a gooseneck hitch inside pickup truck bed

Weight ratings for both bumper-mounted and frame-mounted receiver hitches can be found on the bumper of pickup trucks (for bumper-mounted tow balls) and on the receiver hitch (for frame-mounted receiver hitches).

For flat deck and pickup trucks towing 10,000-to-30,000-pound (4.5 to 13.6 t) trailers there are fifth wheel and gooseneck hitches. These are used for agriculture, industry, and large recreational trailers.

Front trailer hitches are also used on pickup trucks, full-size SUVs, and RVs for multiple purposes. A front-mounted hitch can accommodate additional truck equipment such as front mount bike carriers, fishing/hunting gear, winches, step plates, and snowplows. It also allows a driver to maneuver a trailer with better visibility into a parking site. Front trailer hitches are mounted directly to the frame of a vehicle to ensure a reliable connection. Front hitches are typically equipped with standard-sized receiver tubes to accommodate a variety of removable aftermarket hitch mounted accessories.

=== Europe ===
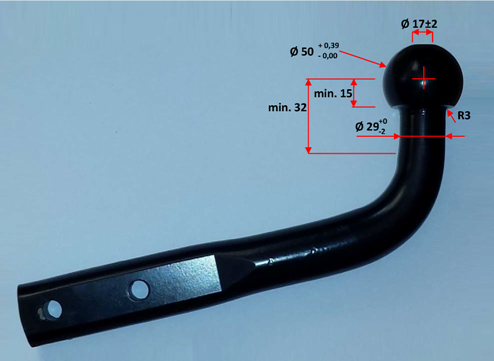
Coupling ball of Class A . (Tow ball 50 mm [1.97 in]). Dimension according to regulation No 55 of the Economic Commission for Europe of the United Nations (UNECE) — Uniform provisions concerning the approval of mechanical coupling components of combinations of vehicles [2018/862], ANNEX 5, Figure 2.

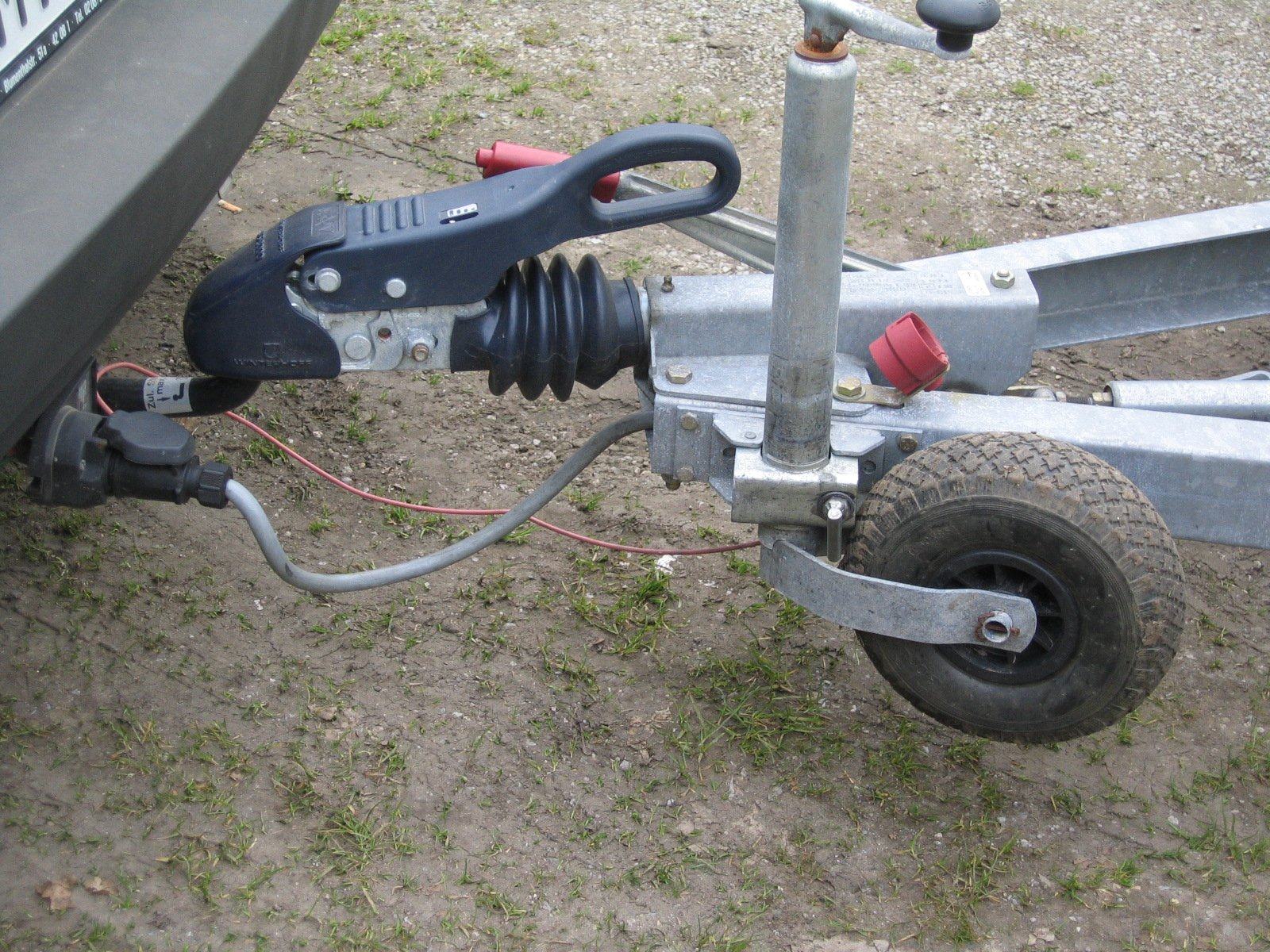
Trailer coupled onto a ball-type tow hitch, with electrical connector plugged in

In the European Union, tow hitches must be a type approved by European Union directive 94/20/EC requirements and fitted to vehicles first registered on or after 1 August 1998.

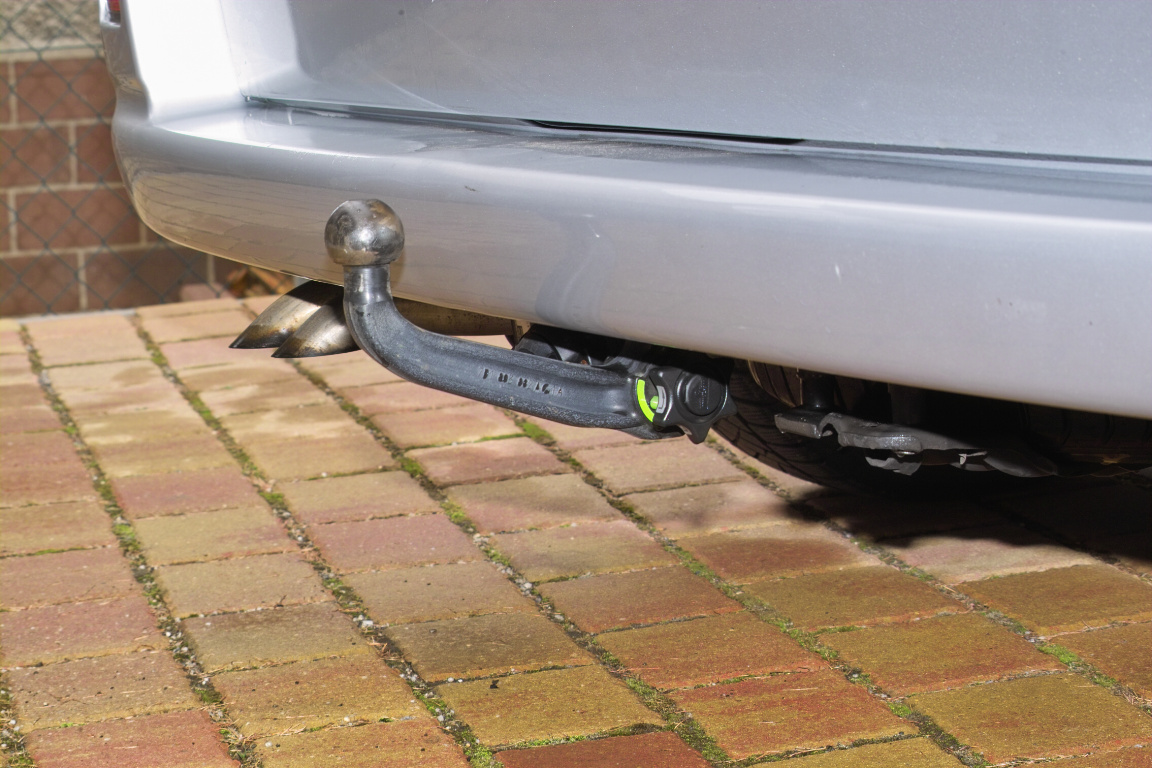
Tow hook mounted on the rear of a vehicle

Outside of North America, the ISO standard tow ball that has been adopted in most of the world is 50 mm (1 31/32 in) in diameter and conforms to a standard BS AU 113b (replaced by BS ISO 1103:2007). With a minor modification, it was published by UNECE on 15 June 2018, as class A.

There are two main categories of ISO tow ball: the flange fitting and the swan-neck which has an extended neck fitting into the tow-bracket. Swan-neck tow balls are often removable to avoid the inconvenience of a tow ball protruding from the vehicle when not required. Some manufacturers are introducing retractable tow balls as an option.

Across Europe around 25% of vehicles have tow balls fitted—but there are distinct regional variations, being more common in Benelux and Scandinavia. In Sweden, around 2.2 million cars of around 4.3 million (just over 50%) have tow balls. In the United Kingdom the popularity of caravans is responsible for a large proportion of four-wheel drive (SUV) vehicles being fitted with tow hitches.

== Electrical connector ==
The vehicle must also be electrically connected to the trailer. Trailer connector variants are standardised at the regional or national and local levels. Some variants are defined by the ISO standards for trailer connectors.

== Trailer tow hitch ==
A car can be equipped with a trailer tow hitch with a removable tow ball.

=== Weight-distributing hitch ===
A weight-distributing hitch is a "load leveling" hitch. It is a hitch setup mounted on the tow vehicle that uses spring bars and chains under tension to distribute part of the trailer's hitch weight from the towing vehicle's rear axle to the towing vehicle's front axle and to the trailer's axle(s). It can help reduce trailer sway and hop. Trailer hop can jerk the tow vehicle. Trailer sway is also called fishtailing. At high speeds, trailer sway can become dangerous. Most vehicle manufacturers will only allow a maximum trailer capacity of 5,000 pounds (2,300 kg) and 500 pounds (230 kg) of tongue weight without using a weight-distributing hitch. Tow vehicles often have square receiver sockets to accept weight distributing hitches.

=== Pintle hook and lunette ring ===
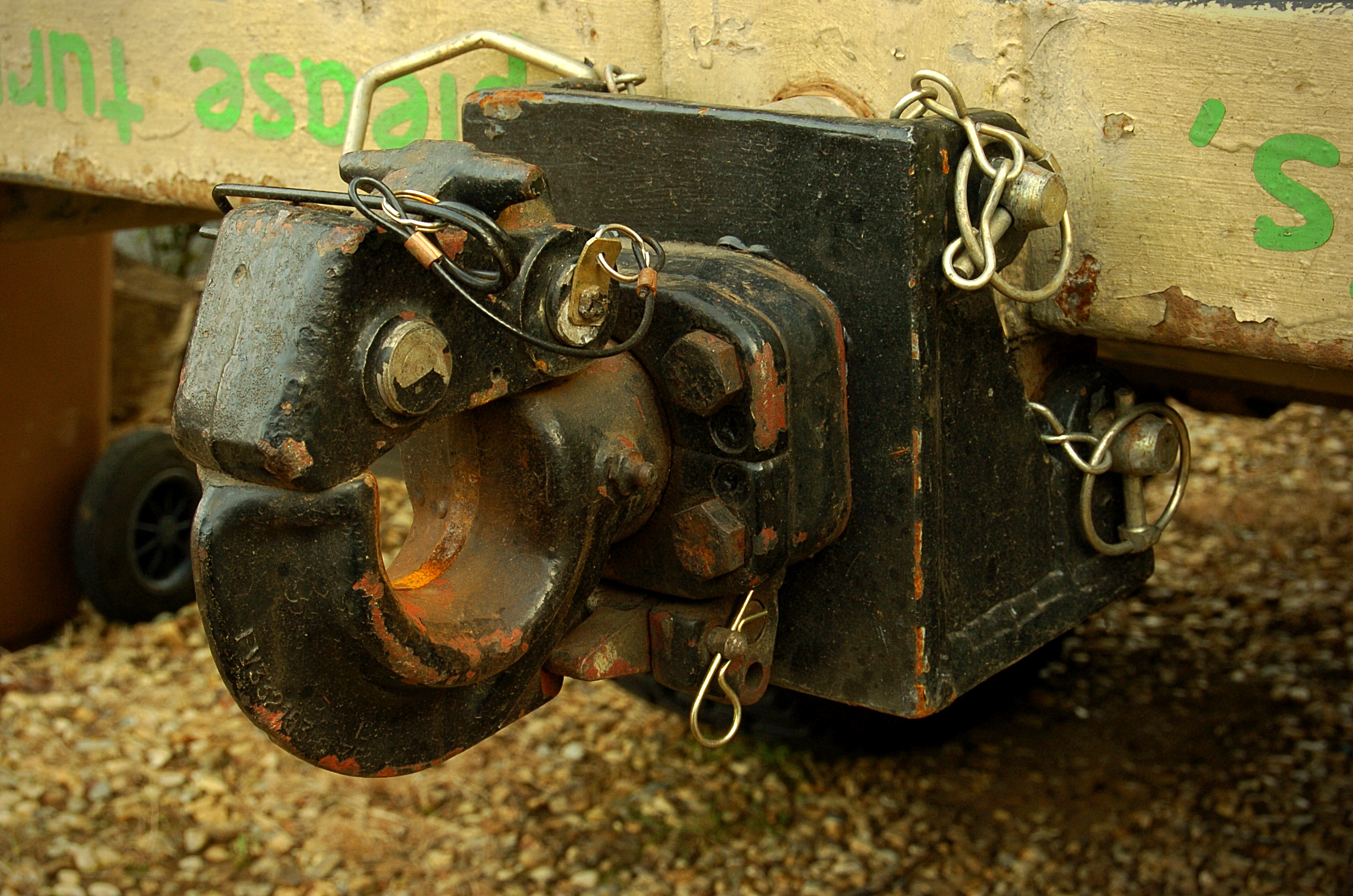
A pintle hook (left) and lunette ring (right) used in military towing

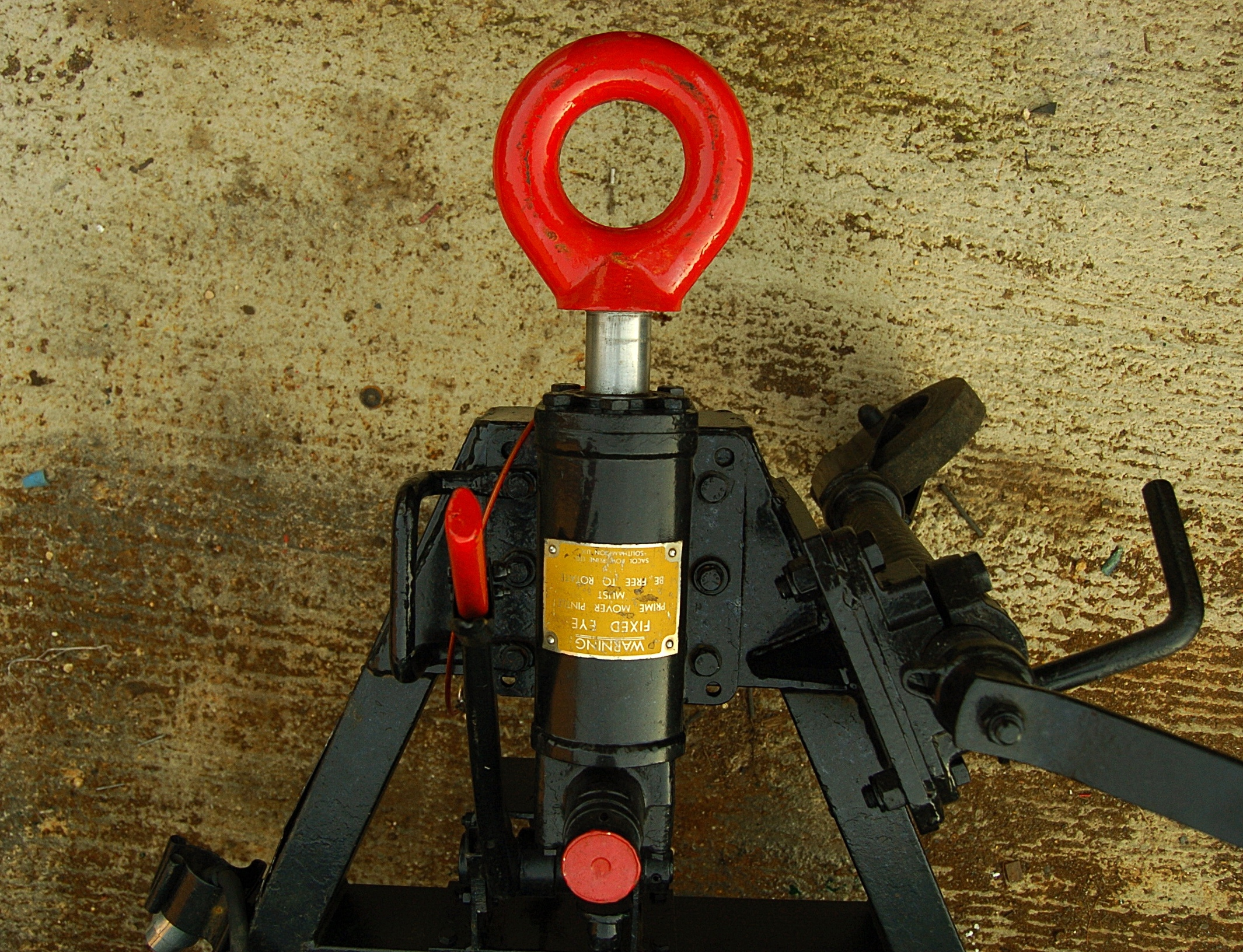

A lunette ring is a type of trailer hitch that works in combination with a pintle hook on the tow vehicle. A pintle hook and lunette ring make a more secure coupling, desirable on rough terrain, compared to ball-type trailer hitches. It is commonly seen in towing applications in agriculture, industry, and the military.

The clearance between the lunette and pintle allows for more relative motion between the trailer and tow vehicle than a ball coupling does. A disadvantage of that is the "slam" transmitted into the towing vehicle with each push/pull load reversal. This becomes a tradeoff between a more secure coupling and a more comfortable towing experience.

=== Gooseneck hitch ===
The gooseneck hitch mounts in the middle of the truck bed. This hitch is designed to be paired with a gooseneck trailer, which can manage heavier loads than a hitch at the back of the tow vehicle.

An advantage of the gooseneck hitch is its tighter turning radius, which helps when towing a big flatbed or car hauler.

A disadvantage of gooseneck hitches is that they prevent the use of the entire truck bed when not towing, as they occupy bed space.

=== Offroad hitch ===
An offroad hitch is able to swivel 360 degrees in pitch and roll, as to accommodate extreme angles between the tow vehicle and trailer encountered when rock crawling or mudding.

== History ==
Before 1932, all trailers used only jaw or hook couplings with an eyelet for trailer towing. In 1932, Franz Knöbel, of Westfalia-Werke developed the trailer hitch with a ball head and socket joint. Franz Knöbel patented the ball head-socket joint trailer hitch invention on March 14, 1934. Westfalia holds a number of towing patents.

== See also ==
- Drawbar (haulage)
- Electronic stability control
- Fifth wheel and gooseneck
- Fifth-wheel coupling
- ISO standards for trailer connectors
- Ringfeder
- Semi-trailer
- Tow truck
- Tractor
- Tractor unit
- Trailer (vehicle)
- Trailer brake controller
- Trailer connector
- Truck nuts
