= 12-volt outlet =

A 12-volt outlet is any electrical outlet that outputs 12 volts and may refer to:

- Cigar lighter receptacle, the most famous example
- Molex connector, used for connecting hard drives and optical drives, and sometimes for powering flash memory surrogate hard drive modules
- Trailer lighting connector, has multiple prongs with 12 volts
