= Trailer connectors in North America =

A number of standards prevail in North America, or parts of it, for trailer connectors, the electrical connectors between vehicles and the trailers they tow that provide a means of control for the trailers.

== Overview ==

=== Symbol Guide ===
Example	Description
	Socket
	Pin

== Introduction ==
In North America, but most commonly the USA market, it is very common for brake lights and turn signals to be combined.

On cars and light trucks (listed below as Light Vehicles) there is no formal standard, instead there is an accepted standard. However, you can not be entirely sure until you have measured the current connector on the vehicle and trailer that they fit each other.

Heavy Vehicles are standardized through SAE J560 which is similar to ISO 1185.

Note that different color coding can be used for certain functions, which means that you can not trust the colors mentioned here without measuring the contact and wiring from case to case. In some cases – as in the flat 4-pin or 5-pin connector – it is fairly obvious which color that is connected to which pin.

In case you have a vehicle that separates the left and right side position lights into 58L and 58R – like many German cars – it is advisable to choose 58L to feed the taillights. These two circuits shall not be merged because it can create problems in the towing vehicle. If you want to be more advanced you can make a simple connection with two diodes that provide balanced load of the circuits. Note that the diodes have to be able to handle high currents or that they are used to control a relay which in turn feeds the trailer. If you have a trailer with a lot of lights the diode and relay wiring is preferred, but if you have a trailer with a simple light arrangement it is usually sufficient to wire to 58L.

In market there are many special converters that solves the problem of connecting a car with European wiring to a trailer with North American wiring. What most of these converters do is to bring together the turn signals and stop lamp signal from a three-wire solution using 54, L and R into a two-wire solution using L54 and R54 according to DIN where brake light and turn indicator uses the same wire and bulb for each side. These converters usually don't handle the case of separate position light circuits for left and right side in the towing vehicle.

== Heavy duty vehicles – SAE J560 ==
7-pin trailer connector according to ISO 1185/SAE J560 (Towing vehicle side)

Physical design according to standard ISO 1185 / SAE J560.

The plug for SAE J560 is physically identical to the connector ISO 1185. The difference is that J560 indicates that the voltage must be 12 V and that wire areas shall be larger due to the higher currents needed when using 12 V compared to 24 V. Some of the pins in the connector have also a slightly different function.

The functional differences are small, but the difference in voltage and current requirements makes the SAE J560 and ISO 1185 incompatible without the use of additional equipment in the form of voltage converters. It is also necessary to pay particular attention to pin 7.

Note that the SAE J560 connector is not controlling the brakes. SAE J560 is typically used on heavy duty trucks and trailers with pneumatic brakes where only the power to the ABS unit and indication of braking by brake light signal is required. The brakes themselves are controlled using air pressure.

SAE J560 was introduced in 1951, which means that older heavy duty vehicles (vintage) may have other connectors.

#	DIN	Signal	Color	Rec. cross-section		Notes
#	DIN	Signal	Color	mm^{2}	AWG	Notes
1	31	Ground (-)	White	10	8	
2	58 or 58L	Clearance lamps/Outline marker lamps, Side marker lamps, identification lamps	Black	4	12	
3	L	Left Turn Signal	Yellow	4	12	
4	54	Stop lamps	Red	6	10	
5	R	Right Turn Signal	Green	4	12	
6	58 or 58R	Tail lamps, registration plate lamp	Brown	4	12	
7		Power to ABS brakes, auxiliary equipment	Blue	6	10	(Note: Area for pin 7 shall be at least 10 AWG according to DOT till 10 AWG.)

The following supplementary information exists for the connector:

== Light vehicles, common connector types ==
Light vehicles use a plethora of contacts, but among these are two that are most common:

- 4-pin flat connector, often used for simpler trailers.
- 7-pin round blade connector, often used in caravans/RVs etc.

Due to this there are unified vehicle outlets on the market that combine these two into a single module.

=== 7-pin round blade connector (SAE J2863) ===
7-pin blade connector (Towing vehicle side)

This is common for RVs and other large trailers which have additional loads beyond the basic for tail lights and brake/turn signals. The standard is defined by SAE J2863, Automotive Trailer Tow Connector.

#	DIN	Signal	Color	Rec. cross-section		Notes
#	DIN	Signal	Color	mm²	AWG	Notes
	31	Ground connected to chassis	White	4	12	
	L54	Left Turn Signal, Stop lamps	Yellow	1.5	16	
	58	Tail lamps, clearance lamps/outline marker lamps and registration plate lamp	Brown	1.5	16	
	15	+12 V via ignition lock	Black	4	12	
	R54	Right Turn Signal, Stop lamps	Green	1.5	16	
		Electric brake control	Blue	4	12	
		Reversing lamps, control current to block surge brakes when reversing.	Purple	1.5	16	

=== 6-pin round connector ===
6-pin round connector (Towing vehicle side)

This contact occurs on medium duty trailers that have both reverse lights and electric brakes.

#	DIN	Signal	Color	Rec. cross-section		Notes
#	DIN	Signal	Color	mm²	AWG	Notes
	31	Ground	White	4	12	
	L54	Left Turn Signal, Stop lamps	Yellow	1.5	16	
		Reversing lamps, control current to block surge brakes when reversing.	Purple	1.5	16	
	R54	Right Turn Signal, Stop lamps	Green	1.5	16	
		Electric brake control	Blue	4	12	
	58	Tail lamps, clearance lamps/outline marker lamps and registration plate lamp	Brown	1.5	16	

=== Flat 5-pin connector ===
Flat 5-pin connector (Towing vehicle side)

This contact is not as common, but is compatible with the 4-pin connector in the way that a towing vehicle with this connector can be connected to a trailer with the 4-pin flat plug.

The extra connection is often used to block the surge brakes when reversing with the trailer.

#	DIN	Signal	Color	Rec. cross-section		Notes
#	DIN	Signal	Color	mm²	AWG	Notes
	31	Ground connected to chassis	White	1.5	16	
	58	Tail lamps, clearance lamps/outline marker lamps and registration plate lamp	Brown	1.0	18	
	L54	Left Turn Signal, Stop lamps	Yellow	1.0	18	
	R54	Right Turn Signal, Stop lamps	Green	1.0	18	
		Reversing lamps, control current to block surge brakes when reversing.	Purple	1.0	18	

=== Flat 4-pin connector ===
Flat 4-pin connector (Towing vehicle side)

This contact is one of the most frequent contacts on the trucks in North America. It contains the minimum necessary signals for complying with regulatory requirements in the United States.

#	DIN	Signal	Color	Rec. cross-section		Notes
#	DIN	Signal	Color	mm²	AWG	Notes
	31	Ground connected to chassis	White	1.5	16	
	58	Tail lamps, clearance lamps/outline marker lamps and registration plate lamp	Brown	1.0	18	
	L54	Left Turn Signal, Stop lamps	Yellow	1.0	18	
	R54	Right Turn Signal, Stop lamps	Green	1.0	18	

== Less common connectors ==
These contacts are less common, and the wiring of these may differ from what is listed here, as well as Application area. The contacts can be for example be used for task lighting, etc.

=== SAE J560-like, type 1 ===
7-pin SAE J560-like, type 1 (Towing vehicle side)

Although this has physical similarities to SAE J560, it is not electrically compatible and should be avoided. Wiring should be made in accordance with SAE J560 instead to avoid problems.

#	DIN	Signal	Color	Rec. cross-section		Notes
#	DIN	Signal	Color	mm²	AWG	Notes
1	31	Ground connected to chassis	White	10	8	
2	15	+12 V via ignition lock	Black	10	8	
3	L54	Left Turn Signal, Stop lamps	Yellow	4	12	
4		Reversing lamps, control current to block surge brakes when reversing.	Red or Purple	6	10	
5	R54	Right Turn Signal, Stop lamps	Green	4	12	
6	58	Tail lamps, clearance lamps/outline marker lamps and registration plate lamp	Brown	4	12	
7		Electric brake control	Blue	6	10	

=== SAE J560-like, type 2 ===
7-pin SAE J560-like, type 2 (Towing vehicle side)

Although this has physical similarities to SAE J560 is not electrically compatible, and shall be avoided. Wiring shall be in accordance with SAE J560 instead to avoid problems.

#	DIN	Signal	Color	Rec. cross-section		Notes
#	DIN	Signal	Color	mm²	AWG	Notes
1	31	Ground connected to chassis	White	10	8	
2		Reversing lamps, control current to block surge brakes when reversing.	Red or Purple	6	10	
3	L54	Left Turn Signal, Stop lamps	Yellow	4	12	
4	15	+12 V via ignition lock	Black	10	8	
5	R54	Right Turn Signal, Stop lamps	Green	4	12	
6	58	Tail lamps, clearance lamps/outline marker lamps and registration plate lamp	Brown	4	12	
7		Electric brake control	Blue	6	10	

=== 6-pin rectangular connector ===
6-pin rectangular connector (Towing vehicle side)

Because this connector has pins in two rows, it is not backwards compatible with the 4-pin and 5-pin flat connectors.

#	DIN	Signal	Color	Rec. cross-section		Notes
#	DIN	Signal	Color	mm²	AWG	Notes
	31	Ground connected to chassis	White	4	12	
		Electric brake control	Blue	4	12	
	15	+12 V via ignition lock	Red	4	12	
	R54	Right Turn Signal, Stop lamps	Green	1.5	16	
	58	Tail lamps, clearance lamps/outline marker lamps and registration plate lamp	Brown	1.5	16	
	L54	Left Turn Signal, Stop lamps	Yellow	1.5	16	

=== 5-pin round connector ===
5-pin round connector (Towing vehicle side)

This contact is less common, and may have completely different wiring than that shown here. The wiring is same as for the 6-pin round connector with center pin (Reversing lamps) excluded.

#	DIN	Signal	Color	Rec. cross-section		Notes
#	DIN	Signal	Color	mm²	AWG	Notes
	31	Ground connected to chassis	White	4	12	
	L54	Left Turn Signal, Stop lamps	Yellow	1.5	16	
	R54	Right Turn Signal, Stop lamps	Green	1.5	16	
		Electric brake control	Blue	4	12	
	58	Tail lamps, clearance lamps/outline marker lamps and registration plate lamp	Brown	1.5	16	

=== 4-pin round connector ===
4-pin round connector (Towing vehicle side)

This connector is available in some cases instead of the flat 4-pin connector. It is less common on the U.S.-built vehicles, than 4-pin flat connector, but is still used in the older truck and SUV setups. A distinctive feature of the trailers that require this type of connector is the fact that they do not have their own braking system and stop along with the towing vehicle.

#	DIN	Signal	Color	Rec. cross-section		Notes
#	DIN	Signal	Color	mm²	AWG	Notes
	31	Ground connected to chassis	White	1.5	16	
	L54	Left Turn Signal, Stop lamps	Yellow	1.0	18	
	R54	Right Turn Signal, Stop lamps	Green	1.0	18	
	58	Tail lamps, clearance lamps/outline marker lamps and registration plate lamp	Brown	1.0	18	

=== 3-pin round connector – DIN9680 ===
Introduced by John Deere for agricultural hardware, then used for other purposes, like yachts and general electric cables.

#	DIN	Signal	Color	Rec. cross-section		Notes
#	DIN	Signal	Color	mm²	AWG	Notes
	15/30	+12 V	Red	2.5	?	
	31	Ground connected to chassis	Black	2.5	?	
	82	+12 V wire after relay (lock in)	Red	?	?	

== See also ==
- Trailer connector
- Trailer connectors in Australia
- Trailer connectors in Europe
- ISO standards for trailer connectors
- Trailer connectors in military organizations
