= Overrun =

Overrun may refer to:

- Overrun brake
- Overrun, the condition of a vehicle travelling without throttle, see freewheel
  - Overrunning clutch, see freewheel
- Buffer overrun, see buffer overflow
- Overrun is the section of a runway, sometimes called a blast pad, that is used as an emergency space to slowly stop planes after an aborted takeoff or a problem on landing
- Cost overrun
- Overrun is the amount of air inccorporated when producing whipped foods such as ice cream or whipped cream
- Overrun (film), a 2021 American action crime comedy
