= Electric brake =

Electric brake is an ambiguous term meaning more than one thing:

- Dynamic braking, Braking using magnetic currents either to charge a battery or waste as heat
- Electric friction brake, Electrically controlled friction brake
- Track brake
- Regenerative brake
- Eddy current brake, Braking using eddy currents
