= ISO standards for trailer connectors =

Standards for electrical connectors

A number of ISO standards cover trailer connectors, the electrical connectors between vehicles and the trailers they tow that provide a means of control for the trailers. These are listed below, with notes on significant deviations from them that can cause problems.

== Trailer connectors between the trailer and passenger car, light truck or heavy trucks with 12V systems ==
In Europe, both 7-pin (ISO 1724) and 13-pin (ISO 11446) are common. The 13-pin version being phased in is newer, provides more services than the 7-pin, a more positive locking and also better protection against moisture and contamination.

The connectors are designed for 12V systems. Exceptions for the 7-pin connector may exist where they may be used for 6V and 24V.

Vehicles and trailers with 6V systems can use the 7-pin or a 5-pin connector, but these are rare today. Heavy trucks that may have 12V systems are usually older (vintage vehicles) or on non-European markets.

The color coding is defined in ISO 4141-3, but the standard color codes are not always followed and may be different for a particular vehicle.

=== 13-pin trailer connector (ISO 11446) ===
13-pin trailer connector of Jaeger type. (screw terminals - trailer PLUG). see photograph

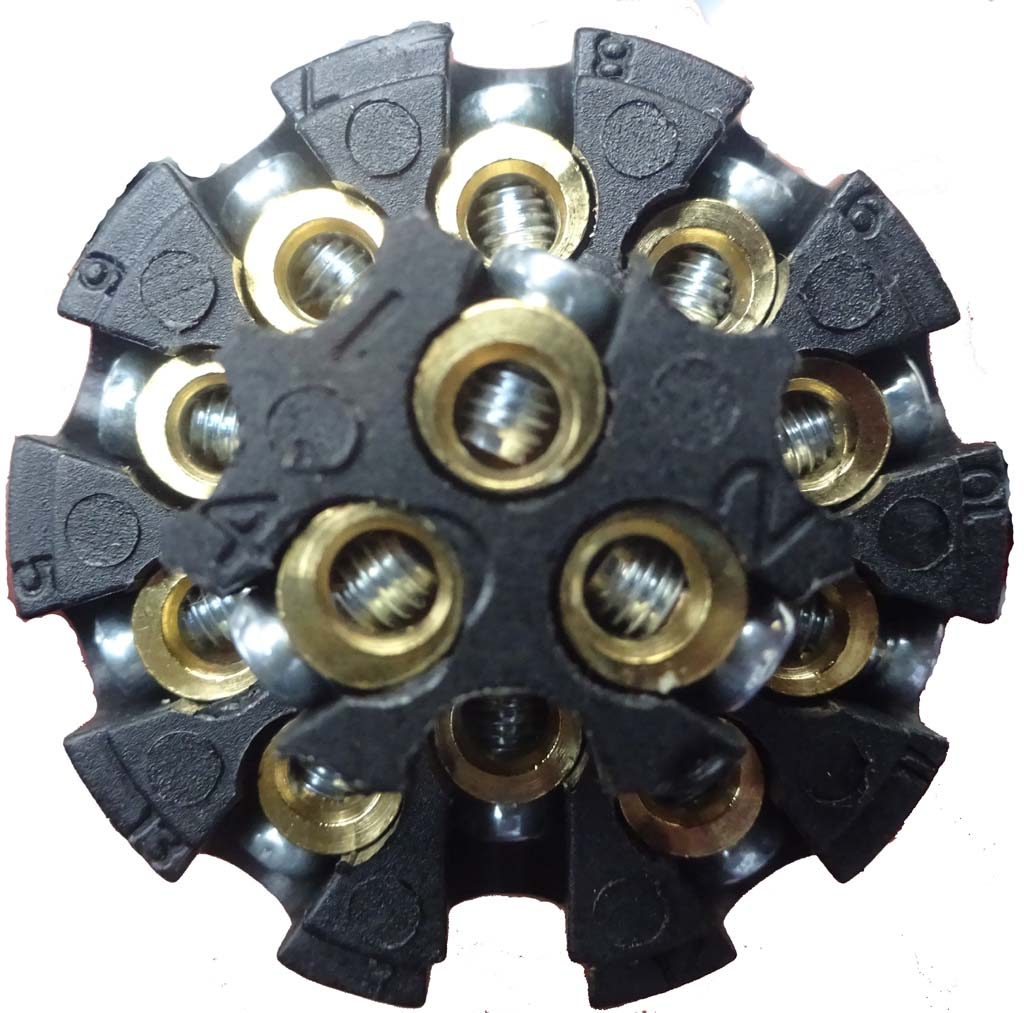
typical rear of 13 pin trailer Plug showing terminals with pin numbers

Physical design of the standard ISO 11446 but also called Jaeger-connector from the company that developed it.

#	DIN	Signal	Color	Rec. cross-section		Notes
#	DIN	Signal	Color	mm²	AWG	Notes
1	L	Left turn signal	Yellow	1.5	15	
2		Rear fog lamps	Blue	1.5	15	
3	31	Ground (-) for pin 1 - 8	White	2.5	13	(Note: Pin 3, 11 and 13 must not be joined in the trailer to avoid interaction between circuit types and over current if one ground pin isn't working.)
4	R	Right turn signal	Green	1.5	15	
5	58R	Tail lamps, clearance lamps/outline marker lamps and registration plate lamp right side	Brown	1.5	15	(Note: Pin 5 and 7 must not be joined in the trailer to avoid problems in vehicles with separate circuits for left and right side.)
6	54	Stop lamps	Red	1.5	15	
7	58L	Tail lamps, clearance lamps/outline marker lamps and registration plate lamp left side	Black	1.5	15	
8		Reversing lamps, control current to block surge brakes when reversing.	Pink	1.5	15	
9	30	+12V permanent	Orange	2.5	13	
10	15	+12V via ignition lock	Grey	2.5	13	
11	31	Ground (-) for pin 10	Black/White	2.5	13	
12		Reserved for future allocation	Light Grey	1.5	15	(Note: Previously allocated to trailer detection in ISO 11446:2002 (the vehicle could detect it was coupled to a trailer using a link between pin 12 and pin 3 in the trailer plug). This function was removed by ISO 11446:2004 and the pin reallocated to reserved. The pin remains reserved for future allocation in ISO 11446-1:2012.)
13	31	Ground (-) for pin 9	Red/White	2.5	13	

The following supplementary information exists for the connector:

Other variants of this connector exists but they are rare. One is used in 24V applications while the other is for ADR use. The difference is how they are mechanically keyed. These connectors are not very common.

=== 7-pin trailer connector for ABS/EBS (ISO 7638-2) ===
12 Volt 7-pin trailer connector ISO 7638-2 for ABS and EBS (Towing vehicle side)

Physical design according to standard ISO 7638-2.

This connector is intended to be used for 12V ABS and EBS on heavy duty trailers.

Identified by key tab on outer ring between pin 3 and 4.

#	DIN	Signal	Color	Rec. cross-section		Notes
#	DIN	Signal	Color	mm²	AWG	Notes
1	30	+12V permanent for control valves	Red	4	11	
2	15	+12V via ignition lock for electronics	Black	1.5	15	
3	31	Ground for electronics(Pin 2)	Yellow	1.5	15	
4	31	Ground for control valves (Pin 1)	Brown	4	11	
5		ABS Fault indication (Active low, i.e. when the voltage is below +5V)	White	1.5	15	(Note: Active low, i.e. when the voltage is below +5V.)
6		CAN H, For EBS and ABS	Green/White	1.5	15	(Note: CAN bus communication according to ISO 11992.) (Note: The CAN bus is not necessary for the ABS to work which means that there are also a 5-pin variant of this connector where the CAN bus pins are excluded.)
7		CAN L, For EBS and ABS	Brown/White	1.5	15	

The following supplementary information exists for the connector:

=== 7-pin trailer connector Type 12N (ISO 1724) ===
7-pin ISO 1724 trailer connector type 12N (Towing vehicle side). This connector uses a mix of pin and socket terminals.

Physical design according to standard ISO 1724.

The 7-pin connector uses all 7 pins on newer trailers according to the ISO standard.

On older trailers there's sometimes a 5-wire setup using a 7-pin connector. In these cases exclude connection for right tail light (58R) and rear fog light (54G) and connect the tail lights only to pin for left tail light (58L).

Joining the pins for right and left tail lights (58R and 58L) can cause problems on German cars where it is possible to activate Standing Lamps on only one side of the vehicle.

#	DIN	Signal	Color	Rec. cross-section		Notes
#	DIN	Signal	Color	mm²	AWG	Notes
1	L	Left turn signal	Yellow	1.5	15	
2	54G	+12V from battery or Rear fog lights	Blue	1.5	15	
3	31	Ground connected to chassis	White or Grey	2.5	13	
4	R	Right turn signal	Green	1.5	15	
5	58R	Tail lights, clearance lights/outline marker lights and registration plate light right side	Brown	1.5	15	
6	54	Stop lights	Red	1.5	15	
7	58L	Tail lights, clearance lights/outline marker lights and registration plate light left side	Black	1.5	15	

==== Pin 2 (54G) ====
According to DIN 72552 pin 54G was initially intended for electrical control of brakes on trailers.

Later pin 2 (54G) has been used for a variety of functions different from the original intent. A few examples:

- +12V permanent.
- +12V via ignition lock.
- Rear fog lights.
- Reversing lights.

This is why in regions using this connector, trailers on the road are occasionally seen with the rear fog lights on when they should be off. (Vehicle wired for +12V, permanent or via ignition and trailer wired for fog lamps)

==== Special case for Australia ====
Australia uses basically the same wiring with the exception for pin 5 and pin 2. The problematic part here is that pin 5 is used for trailer brake which means that if you for some reason connect an Australian trailer to a towing vehicle with ISO wiring you will get into trouble with the trailer brakes being applied as soon as you turn on the lights.

Further reading at Trailer Connector/Australia.

=== 7-pin trailer connector Type 12S (ISO 3732) ===
7-pin ISO 3732 trailer connector type 12S (Towing vehicle side)

Physical design according to standard ISO 3732.

Signals in this connector (if following the standard) are not generally legally required (local regulations may still apply), which means that it is not mandatory to connect it if it is present.

This connector is basically the same as the 12N (ISO 1724) connector, but the center pin (pin 7) has changed gender to make the plug and outlet unique. Socket is replaced with pin in the plug, pin is replaced with socket in outlet.

The purpose of this connector is to supplement the 12N (ISO 1724) connector for power supply of consumers common in caravans (Travel trailers). This is used in Great Britain but may also be used in other areas of Europe.

There are two main variants of the wiring with a switchover date 1999. The difference is that an additional connection for ground and that battery charging in the trailer is shared with other consumers. This means that if a pre-1999 camper trailer with a battery is connected to a post 1999 vehicle there's a risk that the battery charging won't work.

The combination of 12N+12S was replaced in 2008 by the 13-pin ISO 11446 connector.

#	DIN	British	ISO 3732	Color	Rec. cross-section		Notes
#	DIN	-1999	1999-2008	Color	mm²	AWG	Notes
1		Reversing lamps	Reversing lamps	Yellow	1.5	15	
2	(15)	Battery charging	Spare	Blue	2.5	13	(Note: Attention shall be paid to the fact that this pin may not be powered if the towing vehicle is manufactured after 1999 and if the trailer has a battery that is charged by the towing vehicle. The result may be that the battery wouldn't be charged as expected.)
3	31	Common ground	Common ground except for pin 6	White or Grey	2.5	13	
4	30	Feed for internal 12V equipment except refrigerator	+12V permanent	Green	2.5	13	
5		Spare	Spare	Brown	1.5	15	
6	15	Feed for refrigerator	+12V via ignition lock	Red	2.5	13	
7		Spare	ground for pin 6	Black	2.5	13	

The following supplementary information exists for the connector:

=== 5-pin connector (ISO 1724) ===
Physical design according to standard ISO 1724.

The 5-pin has a design and pin layout that is identical to the 7-pin ISO 1724 connector with the exception for the lack of pin 1 (L) and pin 4 (R). This connector is sometimes present on vintage vehicles and the actual wiring may be completely different from what the standard states which means that measuring before connecting is a good idea.

Whenever there is a need to change the plug or outlet it can be replaced with a 7-pin.

== Trailer connectors between heavy duty trailer and the tractor unit ==
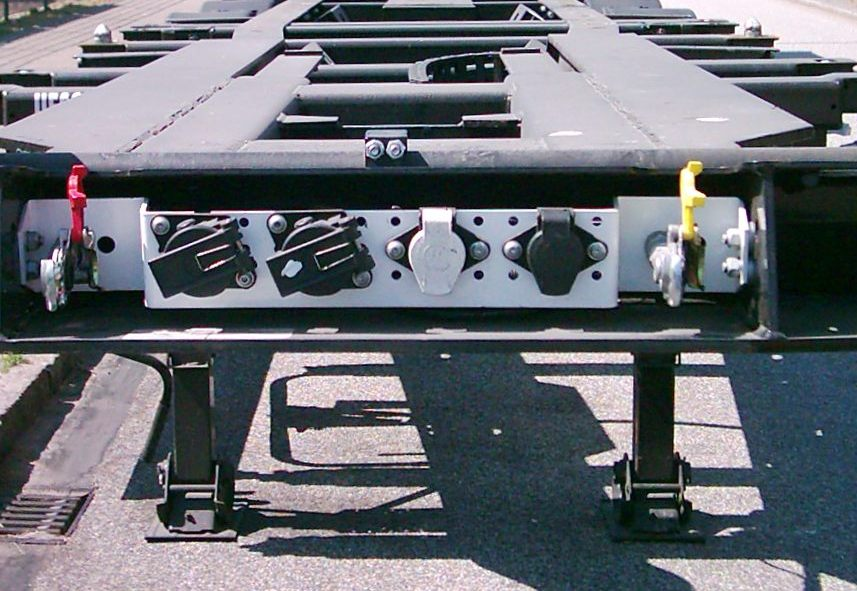
Connectors on a European heavy duty trailer

These connectors are designated as 24 volt.

=== 15-pin trailer connector (ISO 12098) ===
24 Volt 15-pin trailer connector ISO 12098 (Towing vehicle side)

Physical design according to standard ISO 12098.

This connector is present on newer heavy duty commercial trucks and trailers following the ISO standard and is intended to replace the combination of connectors according to standards ISO 1185 and ISO 3731. The 15-pin connector is not designed to replace the ISO 7638 connector.

#	DIN	Signal	Color	Rec. cross-section		Notes
#	DIN	Signal	Color	mm²	AWG	Notes
1	L	Left turn signal	Yellow	1.5	15	
2	R	Right turn signal	Green	1.5	15	
3		Rear fog lamps	Blue	1.5	15	
4	31	Ground (-) for pin 1 - 3 and 5 - 12	White	2.5	13	
5	58L	Tail lamps, clearance lamps/outline marker lamps, identification lamps and registration plate lamp left side	Black	1.5	15	(Note: Pin 5 and 6 must not be joined in the trailer to avoid problems in vehicles with separate circuits for left and right side.) (Note: Identification lamps shall be wired to either pin 5 or 6, not both.)
6	58R	Tail lamps, clearance lamps/outline marker lamps, identification lamps and registration plate lamp right side	Brown	1.5	15	
7	54	Stop lamps	Red	1.5	15	
8		Reversing lamps	Pink	1.5	15	
9	30	+24V permanent	Orange	2.5	13	
10		Brake wear indicator	Grey	1.5	15	
11		Indication of applied parking brake due to loss of air pressure	Black/White	1.5	15	
12		Lift Axle	Blue/White	1.5	15	
13	31	ground (-) for pin 14 and 15	Red/White	2.5	13	
14		CAN H, Not for EBS or ABS	Green/White	1.5	15	(Note: EBS and ABS shall be connected through the ISO 7638 connector.)
15		CAN L, Not for EBS or ABS	Brown/White	1.5	15	

The following supplementary information exists for the connector:

Notice: There was a predecessor to this connector with 13 pins that on a cursory glance is identical to the 15 pin connector but has a different arrangement of the pins. It was not very common but may exist on some vehicles and can result in an unpleasant surprise.

=== 7-pin trailer connector for ABS/EBS (ISO 7638-1) ===
24 Volt 7-pin trailer connector ISO 7638 for ABS and EBS (Towing vehicle side)

Physical design according to standard ISO 7638-1.

This connector is intended for 24V ABS and EBS on heavy duty trailers.

Identified by key tab on outer ring by pin 5.

#	DIN	Signal	Color	Rec. cross-section		Notes
#	DIN	Signal	Color	mm²	AWG	Notes
1	30	+24V permanent for control valves	Red	4	11	
2	15	+24V via ignition lock for electronics	Black	1.5	15	
3	31	Ground for electronics(Pin 2)	Yellow	1.5	15	
4	31	Ground for control valves (Pin 1)	Brown	4	11	
5		ABS Fault indication	White	1.5	15	
6		CAN H, For EBS and ABS	Green/White	1.5	15	(Note: CAN bus communication according to ISO 11992.) (Note: The CAN bus is not necessary for the ABS to work which means that there are also a 5-pin variant of this connector where the CAN bus pins are excluded.)
7		CAN L, For EBS and ABS	Brown/White	1.5	15	

The following supplementary information exists for the connector:

=== 7-pin trailer connector 24N (ISO 1185) ===
24 Volt 7-pin trailer connector ISO 1185 (Viewed from back of plug where wires connect to pins)

Physical design according to standard ISO 1185.

This connector is common on heavy duty commercial trucks and trailers but is replaced by the ISO 12098 connector on newer vehicles.

#	DIN	Signal	Color	Rec. cross-section		Notes
#	DIN	Signal	Color	mm²	AWG	Notes
1	31	Ground (-)	White	2.5	13	
2	58L	Tail lamps, clearance lamps/outline marker lamps, identification lamps and registration plate lamp left side	Black	1.5	15	(Note: Pin 2 and 6 must not be joined in the trailer to avoid problems in vehicles with separate circuits for left and right side.) (Note: Identification lamps shall be wired to either pin 2 or 6, not both.)
3	L	Left turn signal	Yellow	1.5	15	
4	54	Stop lamps	Red	1.5	15	
5	R	Right turn signal	Green	1.5	15	
6	58R	Tail lamps, clearance lamps/outline marker lamps, identification lamps and registration plate lamp right side	Brown	1.5	15	
7		Trailer brake control according to ISO 1185, SAE J560 use is different	Blue	1.5	15	

The following supplementary information exists for the connector:

The physical design is also used by SAE J560 with basically the same configuration. The difference is that SAE J560 uses 12V (larger wire cross-section and higher amp rating on fuses). Pin 7 may also have a different behavior on SAE J560.

=== 7-pin trailer connector 24S (ISO 3731) ===
24 Volt 7-pin trailer connector ISO 3731 (Towing vehicle side)

Physical design according to standard ISO 3731.

This connector is common but on newer vehicles it is replaced by the connectors according to ISO 12098 and ISO 7638.

#	DIN	Signal	Color	Rec. cross-section		Notes
#	DIN	Signal	Color	mm²	AWG	Notes
1	31	Ground (-)	White	2.5	13	
2		ABS Fault indication	Black	1.5	15	
3		Reversing lamps	Yellow	1.5	15	
4	30	+24V permanent	Red	2.5	13	
5		Control via Ground	Green	1.5	15	
6	15	+24V via ignition lock	Brown	2.5	13	
7		Rear fog lamps	Blue	1.5	15	

== See also ==
- Trailer connector
- Trailer connectors in Australia
- Trailer connectors in Europe
- Trailer connectors in North America
- Trailer connectors in military organizations

Example	Description
	Socket
	Pin
