= Toyota Trailer T10 =

Trailer manufactured for the Toyota Land Cruiser

The Toyota Trailer T10 was a trailer manufactured by Toyota that was designed to go behind the Toyota Land Cruiser or the Toyota Weapon Carrier using a ring hitch.
