= Trailer connectors in Europe =

A number of standards prevail in Europe for trailer connectors, the electrical connectors between vehicles and the trailers they tow that provide a means of control for the trailers.

== 7 and 13-pin connectors ==
The 13-pin (ISO 11446) version being phased in is newer, provides more services than the 7-pin (ISO 1724), a more positive locking and also better protection against moisture and contamination.

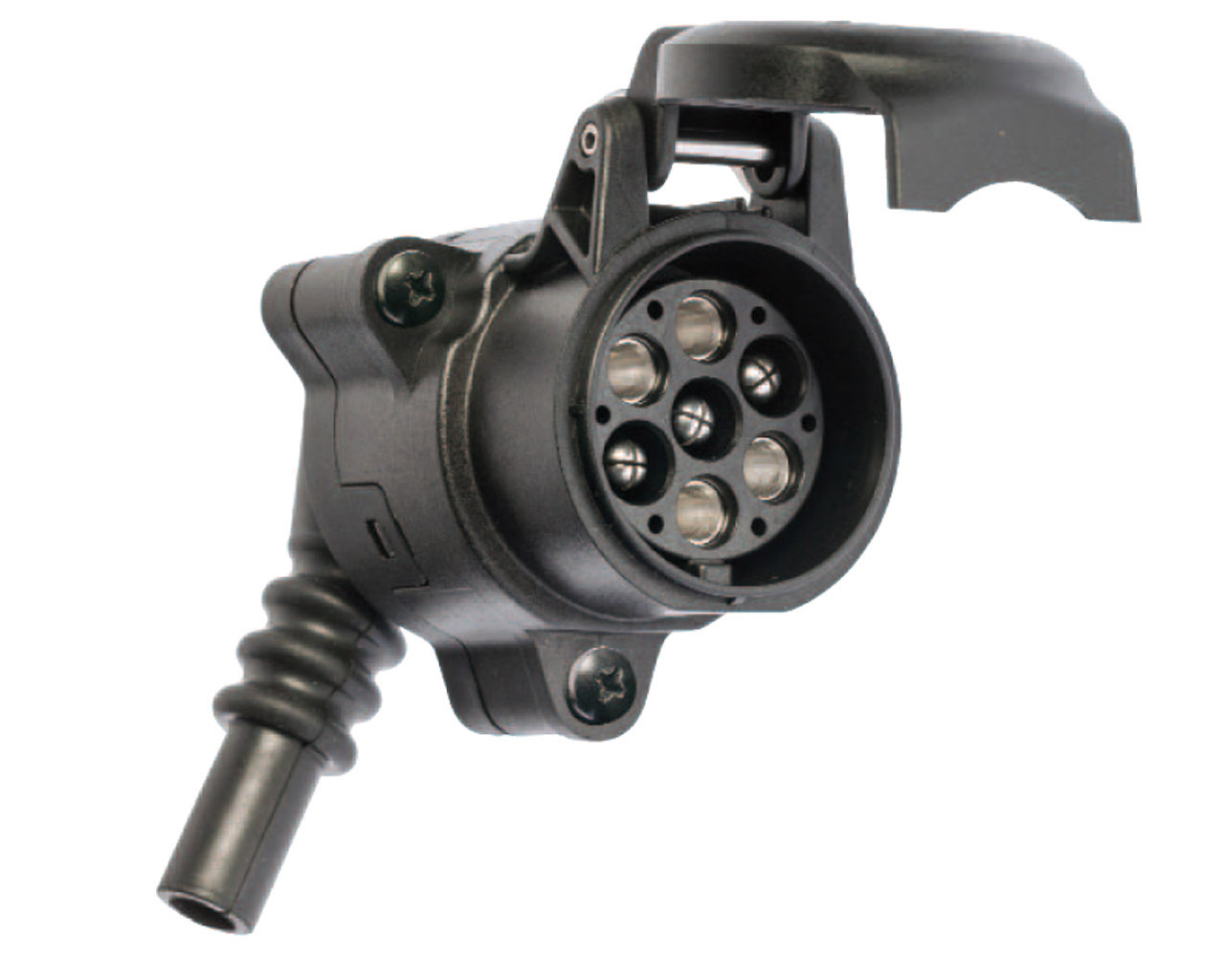
7-pin connectors (ISO 1724)

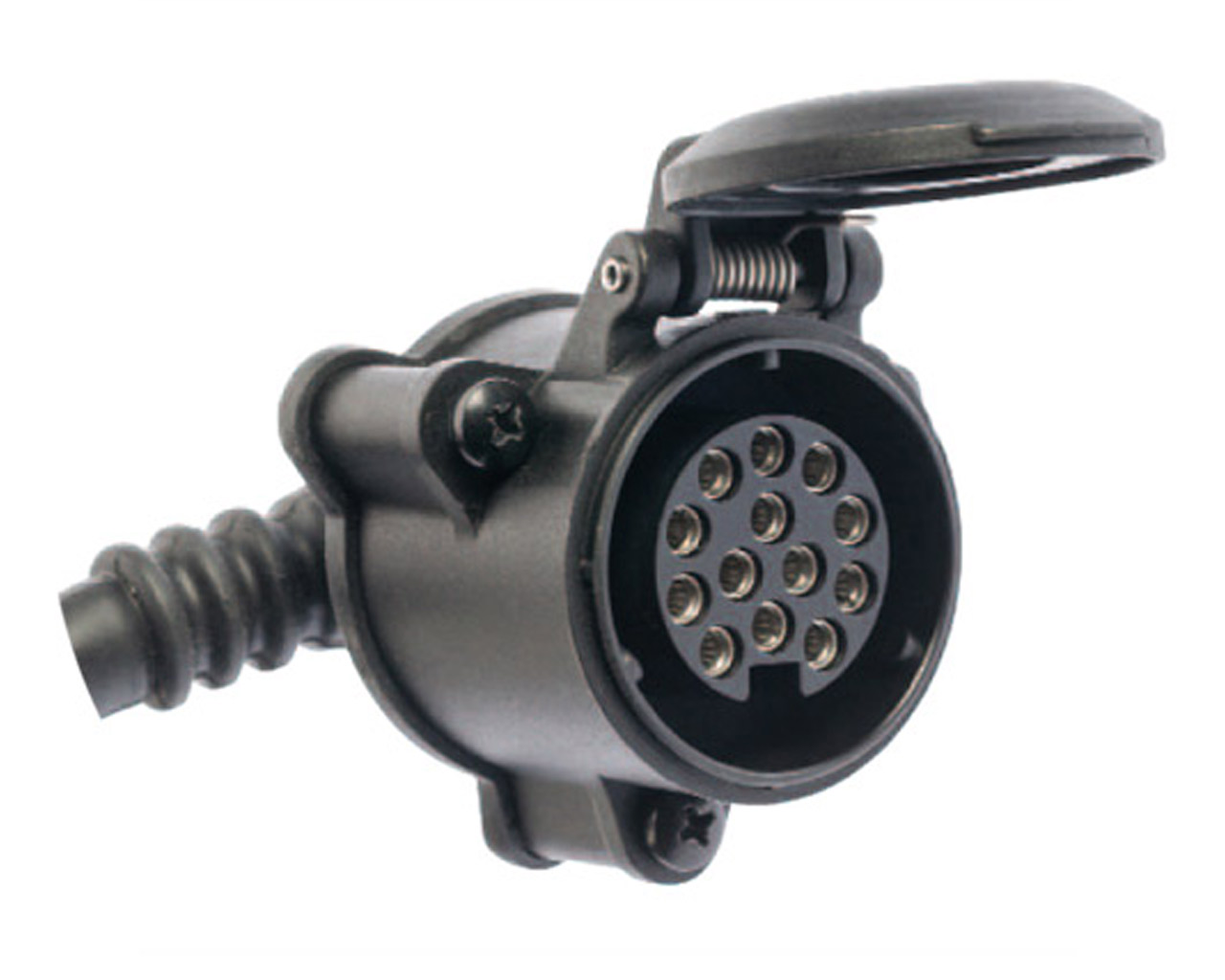
13-pin connectors (ISO 11446)

== NEN 6120—Connectors based on ISO 1724 ==
Multicon Feder and Multicon WeSt (Welt Standard) connectors are precursors to ISO 11446 in a design that is intended to be compatible with ISO 1724. This means that if a towing vehicle has an outlet of this type it should be able to connect a trailer with a standard 7-pin or 5-pin connector according to ISO 1724, provided that the trailer coupling follows the standard and that the trailer plug casing is not made of metal since a metal plug will otherwise short the extra pins.

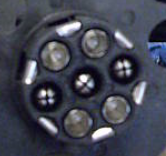
13-pin trailer connection of type Multicon Feder

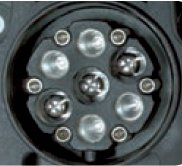
13-pin trailer connection of type Multicon WeST

Both connectors have the same electrical wiring and can be found primarily in the Netherlands and Germany.

#	DIN	Signal	Colour	Rec. Cross-section		Notes
#	DIN	Signal	Colour	mm^{2}	AWG	Notes
1	L	Left Turn Signal	Yellow	1.5	15	
2	54G	+12V from battery or Rear fog lamps	Blue	1.5	15	
3	31	Ground connected to chassis	White	2.5	13	(Note: Pin 3 and 13 must not be joined in the trailer to avoid interaction between circuit types and over current if one ground pin isn't working.)
4	R	Right Turn Signal	Green	1.5	15	
5	58R	Tail lamps, clearance lamps and registration plate lamp right side	Brown	1.5	15	(Note: Pin 5 and 7 must not be joined in the trailer to avoid problems in vehicles with separate circuits for left and right side.)
6	54	Stop lamps	Red	1.5	15	
7	58L	Tail lamps, clearance lamps and registration plate lamp left side	Black	1.5	15	
8		Reversing lamps, control current to block surge brakes when reversing.	Pink or Red/Black	1.5	15	
9	30	+12V permanent	Orange or Brown/White	2.5	13	
10	15	+12V via ignition lock	Grey	2.5	13	
11		Spare	Black/White	1.5	15	
12		Spare until 2012 when it became the trailer detector pin if grounded in the trailer	Light Grey	1.5	15	
13	31	Ground (−) for pin 9 and 10	Red/White	2.5	13	

The following supplementary information exists for the connector:

== Connectors of DIAB/VBG-typ ==
These connectors are specially developed by sv:Djurle Industri AB (DIAB) for severe conditions where snow, ice and salt are common. They can be equipped with an optional heating loop if necessary. Moreover, they are "self-disconnecting" to lower the risk of damage to the connector if the driver should forget to disconnect the plug when disconnecting the trailer or the trailer jumps off the hook.

The 14-pin, 17-pin and 22-pin connectors have the same physical dimensions, but different contact elements in the contacts.

These connectors occur primarily in Scandinavia, but vendors exist in the United States, Belgium and Great Britain, which means that they can be found outside Scandinavia as well.

Connections for these contacts listed as spare are free to use.

Maximum allowable current for ground contact is 25A.

=== 12-pin DIAB P12 ===
Connector DIAB P12

This connector is designed for 12V electrical system where the standard ISO connectors are considered insufficient. The connector is designed in the same manner as the connectors for heavy vehicles, but is physically smaller.

#	DIN	Signal	Colour	Rec. Cross-section		Notes
#	DIN	Signal	Colour	mm^{2}	AWG	Notes
1	31	Ground (−) for pin 1–8	White	2.5	13	
2	L	Left Turn Signal	Yellow	1.5	15	
3	54	Stop lamps	Red	1.5	15	
4	58L	Tail lamps, clearance lamps and registration plate lamp left side	Black	1.5	15	(Note: Pin 4 and 5 must not be joined in the trailer to avoid problems in vehicles with separate circuits for left and right side.)
5	58R	Tail lamps, clearance lamps and registration plate lamp right side	Brown	1.5	15	
6	R	Right Turn Signal	Green	1.5	15	
7		Reversing lamps, control current to block surge brakes when reversing.	Pink	1.5	15	
8		Rear fog lamps	Blue	1.5	15	
9		Spare				
10		Spare				
11		Spare				
12	30	+12V permanent	Orange	2.5	13	

The following supplementary information exists for the connector:

=== 14-pin ===
14-pin standard connector

14-pin extra sealed connector of ADR type

#	DIN	Signal	Colour	Rec. Cross-section		Notes
#	DIN	Signal	Colour	mm^{2}	AWG	Notes
1	31	Ground (−) for pin 1–3 and 5–12	White	2.5	13	
2	L	Left Turn Signal	Yellow	1.5	15	
3	R	Right Turn Signal	Green	1.5	15	
4	54	Stop lamps	Red	1.5	15	
5	58L	Tail lamps, clearance lamps, identification lamps and registration plate lamp left side	Black	1.5	15	(Note: Pin 5 and 6 must not be joined in the trailer to avoid problems in vehicles with separate circuits for left and right side.)
6	58R	Tail lamps, clearance lamps, identification lamps and registration plate lamp right side	Brown	1.5	15	
7A		Reversing lamps	Pink	1.5	15	
7B		Rear fog lamps	Blue	1.5	15	
8A		Spare				
8B		Spare				
9		Spare				
10		Spare				
11		Spare				
12	30	+24V permanent	Orange	2.5	13	

The following supplementary information exists for the connector:

=== 17-pin ===
17-pin standard connector

17-pin extra sealed connector of ADR type

This connector is used in cases where a 14-pin connector is insufficient

#	DIN	Signal	Colour	Rec. Cross-section		Notes
#	DIN	Signal	Colour	mm^{2}	AWG	Notes
1	31	Ground (−) for pin 1–3 and 5–12	White	2.5	13	
2	L	Left Turn Signal	Yellow	1.5	15	
3	R	Right Turn Signal	Green	1.5	15	
4	54	Stop lamps	Red	1.5	15	
5	58L	Tail lamps, clearance lamps, identification lamps and registration plate lamp left side	Black	1.5	15	(Note: Pin 5 and 6A must not be joined in the trailer to avoid problems in vehicles with separate circuits for left and right side.)
6A	58R	Tail lamps, clearance lamps, identification lamps and registration plate lamp right side	Brown	1.5	15	
6B		Spare				
7A		Reversing lamps	Pink	1.5	15	
7B		Rear fog lamps	Blue	1.5	15	
8		Spare				
9A		Spare				
9B		Spare				
10A		Spare				
10B		Spare				
11A		Spare				
11B		Spare				
12	30	+24V permanent	Orange	2.5	13	

The following supplementary information exists for the connector:

=== 22-pin ===
DIAB 22-pin connector

This connector is a further development of the 17-pin connector for cases requiring support for many functions.

#	DIN	Signal	Colour	Rec. Cross-section		Notes
#	DIN	Signal	Colour	mm^{2}	AWG	Notes
1	31	Ground (−) for pin 1–3 and 5–12	White	2.5	13	
2A	L	Left Turn Signal	Yellow	1.5	15	
2B		Spare				
3A	R	Right Turn Signal	Green	1.5	15	
3B		Spare				
4A	54	Stop lamps	Red	1.5	15	
4B		Spare				
5A	58L	Tail lamps, clearance lamps, identification lamps and registration plate lamp left side	Black	1.5	15	(Note: Pin 5A and 6A must not be joined in the trailer to avoid problems in vehicles with separate circuits for left and right side.)
5B		Spare				
6A	58R	Tail lamps, clearance lamps, identification lamps and registration plate lamp right side	Brown	1.5	15	
6B		Spare				
7A		Reversing lamps	Pink	1.5	15	
7B		Rear fog lamps	Blue	1.5	15	
8A		Spare				
8B		Spare				
9A		Spare				
9B		Spare				
10A		Spare				
10B		Spare				
11A		Spare				
11B		Spare				
12	30	+24V permanent	Orange	4–6	9–11	

The following supplementary information exists for the connector:

== See also ==
- Trailer connector
- Trailer connectors in Australia
- ISO standards for trailer connectors
- Trailer connectors in North America
- Trailer connectors in military organizations

Example	Description
	Socket
	Pin
