= 4007 =

4007 may refer to:

== Astronomy ==
- 4007 Euryalos, a larger Jupiter trojan from the Greek camp

== Transportation ==
- General Motors TD-4007, a 1944–1945 American transit bus
- General Motors TG-4007, a 1944–1945 American transit bus
- Peugeot 4007, a 2007–2012 Japanese-French compact SUV
- STANAG 4007, a standard agreement in military organizations for trailer connections
