= Ford TowCommand =

The optional factory in-dash installed Ford Motor Company "TowCommand" integrated TBC (Trailer Brake Controller) system available and compatible on the heavy duty commercial Ford Super Duty line of trucks starting with the 2005 models. TowCommand has since been added to the full-size Ford F-150 pickup and the full-size Ford Expedition SUV. It is built and engineered jointly with Tekonsha who are known for their Prodigy TBC.

With adjustable +/- trailer braking gain in a digital readout from 0.0 (no trailer brakes) to 10.0 (full trailer braking) in 0.5 increments and a manual override lever (to test trailer braking action), the Ford 'built into the dash' TBC provides smooth braking even when pulling up to a 15,000 lb 4-axle conventional (receiver mounted) or 26,000 lb 4-axle 5th Wheel (bed/frame mounted) trailer. TowCommand being different from most aftermarket TBCs, ties into the trucks' computer and hydraulics, so it senses truck brake pressure and can apply trailer brakes as fast as the truck's brakes. Master Brake Systems 'BrakeSmart' TBC is the only other TBC that taps into the trucks hydraulic lines in modern trucks.

The TowCommand TBC is made of three major components; the in-dash TBC module, a TowCommand master cylinder with a brake pressure transducer, and an activated PCM (Powertrain Control Module) parameter by a Ford dealer's NGS or WDS programming method. All 2005 and newer Ford Super Duty trucks are pre-wired for the TBC from the factory, no matter if the TBC option was ordered and installed at the time of the trucks assembly or not.

Before ABS (Anti-lock Braking System) came to trucks in the 1980s, most TBCs were activated by the trucks' brake hydraulic action. In an emergency situation with the trucks ABS activated, Ford's TowCommand can automatically reduce the trailer brake pressure (gain) as it communicates with the truck's computer for faster reaction time with proportional trailer brake control, to prevent the trailer brakes from locking up even though trailers do not have ABS sensors. TowCommand will also inform the driver with an audible alarm and in the digital readout if the trailer wires and/or trailer disconnects from the truck. Next to the TowCommand is an empty storage tray or the $85 optional 4 AUX (auxiliary) toggle switches for winches, snow plow, off-road lights, etc.

The only disadvantage, unlike aftermarket TBCs, is that it cannot be transferred from one truck to another. Another advantage, unlike aftermarket TBCs, any Ford service center can have it serviced. The TowCommand is covered by the standard bumper-to-bumper warranty as long as it is not discovered to be an actual trailer problem. The TowCommand has only been verified to be compatible with trailers having electric-actuated drum brakes (one to four axles) and not hydraulic surge or electric-over-hydraulic types.
