= ISO 11446 =

Standard for electrical connection with a towed vehicle

- Type: Trailer Connector
- Superseded: ISO 1724 (12N); ISO 3732 (12S)

General specifications
- Pins: 13

Pinout
- Pin 1: Left indicator
- Pin 2: Rear fog lamp
- Pin 3: Ground (Note: Pins 3, 11 & 13 must not be joined in the trailer to prevent ground loops)
- Pin 4: Right indicator
- Pin 5: Right tail lamp (Note: Pins 5 & 7 must not be joined in the trailer without a pair of diodes)
- Pin 6: Brake lamp
- Pin 7: Left tail lamp
- Pin 8: Reverse lamp
- Pin 9: Permanent power
- Pin 10: Switched supply (for fridge)
- Pin 11: Ground for pin 10
- Pin 12: Trailer Presence Detection (Note: Pin 12 was assigned prior to 2012; older vehicles could be using this for a different function)
- Pin 13: Ground for pin 9

ISO 11446:2004 specifies a 13-pole electrical connector between towing and towed vehicles with 12 volt electrical system. It was developed in 1987 by Erich Jaeger to replace older 7-pin plugs.

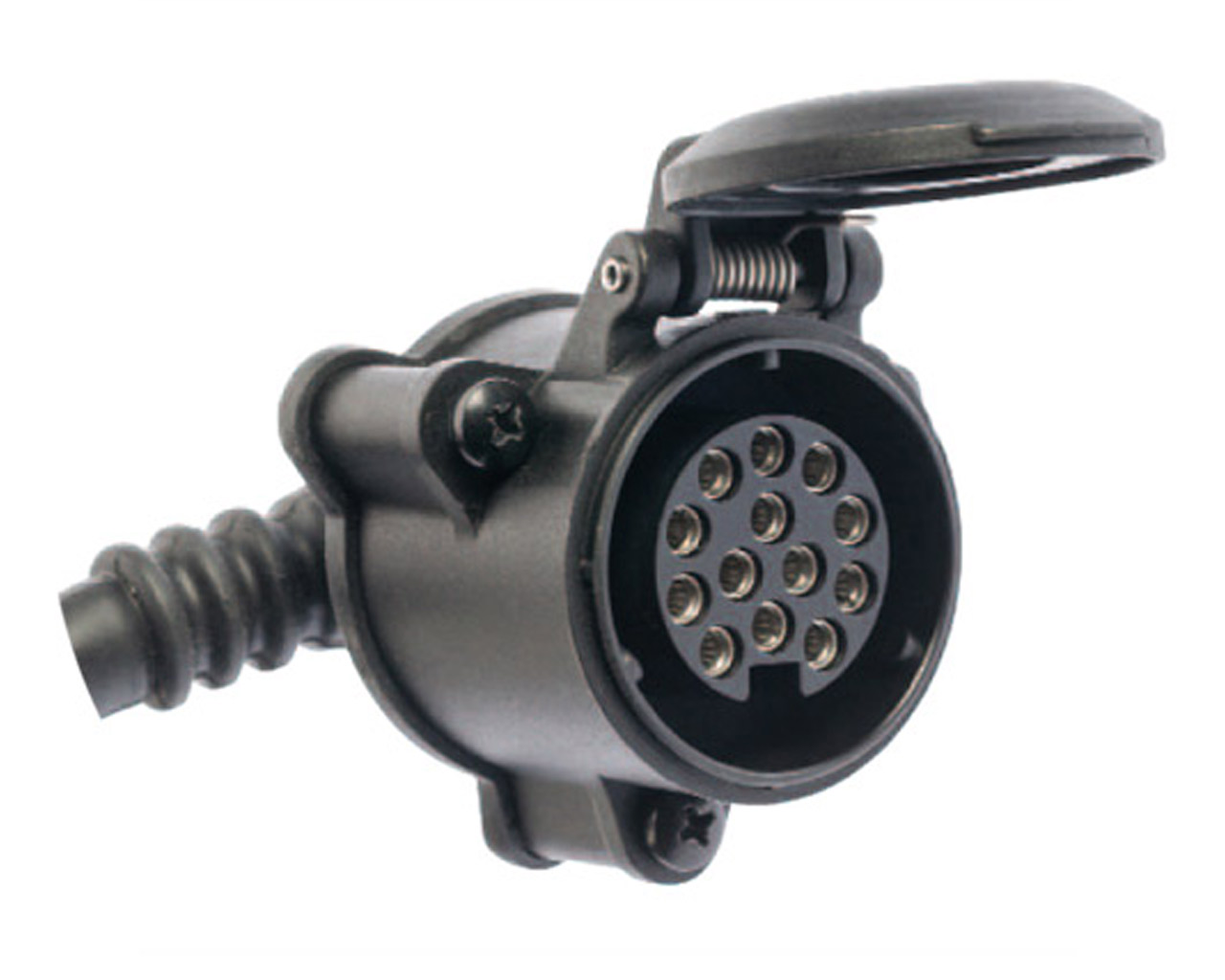

== Sources ==
- Right Connections UK Limited
- ISO 11446 (2004)
- ISO 11446-1 (2012)
- ISO 11446-2 (2012)
