= Trailer brake controller =

A brake controller is usually an original equipment manufacturer or aftermarket-installed device or module. It is mounted to the tow vehicle's driver's-side dashboard area, and engages a trailer's electrical braking system either time delayed, or in proportion to the tow vehicle's brake engagement when slowing down or coming to a halt. A brake controller is not needed with a trailer surge braking system unless using modern electric over hydraulic devices. The trailer in this case usually has either electric friction brakes or electric-hydraulic trailer brake actuators.

Most basic brake controllers will generally have a plus-minus gain adjustment. The tow vehicle operator sets the gain as high as possible but without the trailer brakes locking up after making a few test stops. The heavier the trailer, the higher the gain adjustment is set and therefore the less chances of wheel lock-up.

A wide range of trailers contain trailer brakes (for example, larger boat trailers, horse trailers, covered utility trailers, enclosed trailers, travel trailers including small 10-foot or 3.0-metre and longer tent trailers and car carriers). Smaller trailers may not contain trailer brakes (for example, basic 4-by-8-foot or 1.2-by-2.4-metre utility trailers). It is recommended that, if the total trailer weight is over a couple thousand kilograms, the trailer have some sort of braking system, and the tow vehicle be equipped with a brake controller.

== Types ==
There are different types of brake controllers currently or previously on the market.

Air-actuated electric brake controller
This controller uses the air pressure of the brake system on a vehicle with pneumatic brakes to provide a current to control the electric brakes of a trailer.
Hydraulic-actuated electric controller
This controller uses the hydraulic pressure of the brake system on a vehicle with hydraulic brakes to provide a current to control the electric brakes of a trailer. Some truck manufacturers offers this as an OEM option, like Ford with its Ford TowCommand.
Pedal-mounted pressure pad proportional controller;
A separate sensor is mounted on the brake pedal to connect to the controller.
Proportional brake controller
Senses the deceleration of the vehicle through a pendulum or similar device to apply a suitable current for braking of the trailer.
Surge brake
When the tow vehicle slows down the trailer pushes against it, an actuator applies force to its master cylinder and the hydraulic pressure is transferred to the brakes
Time-delayed brake controller
Applies brake current with a ramp-up over time to a certain level set by the driver.
