= Trailer connectors in military organizations =

A number of standards specific to military organizations exist for trailer connectors, the electrical connectors between vehicles and the trailers they tow that provide a means of control for the trailers. These can be found on surplus equipment sold for civilian use.

== NATO ==
Trailer connector according to NATO STANAG 4007

NATO uses a 12-pin connector (Note: Maximum current per pin is 15A.) (Note: Total maximum current is 30A, which is solved by dual ground pin (D and L).) according to STANAG 4007. However, note that there are often deviations from the standard depending on which country it is applied, which means that the table below may not be accurate.

Nr	STANAG 4007
A	Blackout - Disconnect power to all normal lighting. Only specially designed lamps according to STANAG 4381 is allowed, but shall only be activated if terminal C is active.
B	Left Turn Signal
C	Blackout marker lights according to STANAG 4381
D	Ground (Note: Positive Ground is permitted provided that the vehicle is labeled.)
E	Tail lamps, clearance lamps/outline marker lamps and registration plate lamp
F	Blackout stop lights according to STANAG 4381
H	Rear fog lamps
J	Right Turn Signal
K	+24V or +12V (Note: Rated voltage is 24V, although 12V is permitted provided that the vehicle is labeled.); via ignition lock OR permanent (Note: Behavior of pin K may vary from vehicle to vehicle.).
L	Ground
M	Stop lamps
N	Reversing lamps, control current to block surge brakes when reversing.

The following supplementary information exists for the connector:

Some documentation indicates that the terminal A, C and H must be interconnected, this will conflict with the definition of Blackout and Convoy modes according to STANAG 4007 when these pins have different purposes. To clarify:

- Pin A is for activation of so-called Blackout Mode. It turns off all the lights except convoy lighting if it is active. The lighting inside the vehicle shall also be extinguished if it is not specifically shaded.
- Pin C is for Convoy Lamps, which is the special convoy lighting, corresponding to the tail lights, to be used while driving in the dark.
- Pin H is for rear fog light and the rear fog light shall also be disabled when pin A is active.

== Swedish Armed Forces ==
Connector on Swedish Defense vehicles

This is physically the same connector as the NATO connector, but with completely different wiring. This means mixing this up with the STANAG 4007 wiring runs the risk for short circuits and blown fuses.

Nr	Swedish Armed Forces
A	Tail lamps, clearance lamps/outline marker lamps and registration plate lamp left side.
B	Tail lamps, clearance lamps/outline marker lamps and registration plate lamp right side.
C	Stop lamps
D	Left Turn Signal
E	Right Turn Signal
F	Blackout marker lights
H	Blackout stop lights
J	+24V or +12V (Note: Rated voltage is normally 24V, although 12V is permitted provided that the vehicle is labeled.); via ignition lock OR permanent (Note: Behavior of pin J may vary from vehicle to vehicle.).
K	Ground
L	Reversing lamps, control current to block surge brakes when reversing.
M	Spare (Note: Pin M may be used on some vehicles.)
N	Spare (Note: Pin N may be used on some vehicles.)

The following supplementary information exists for the connector:

== See also ==
- Trailer connector
- Trailer connectors in Australia
- Trailer connectors in Europe
- ISO standards for trailer connectors
- Trailer connectors in North America

Example	Description
	Socket
	Pin
