= Overrun brake =

Trailer braking system using inertia from the towed vehicle

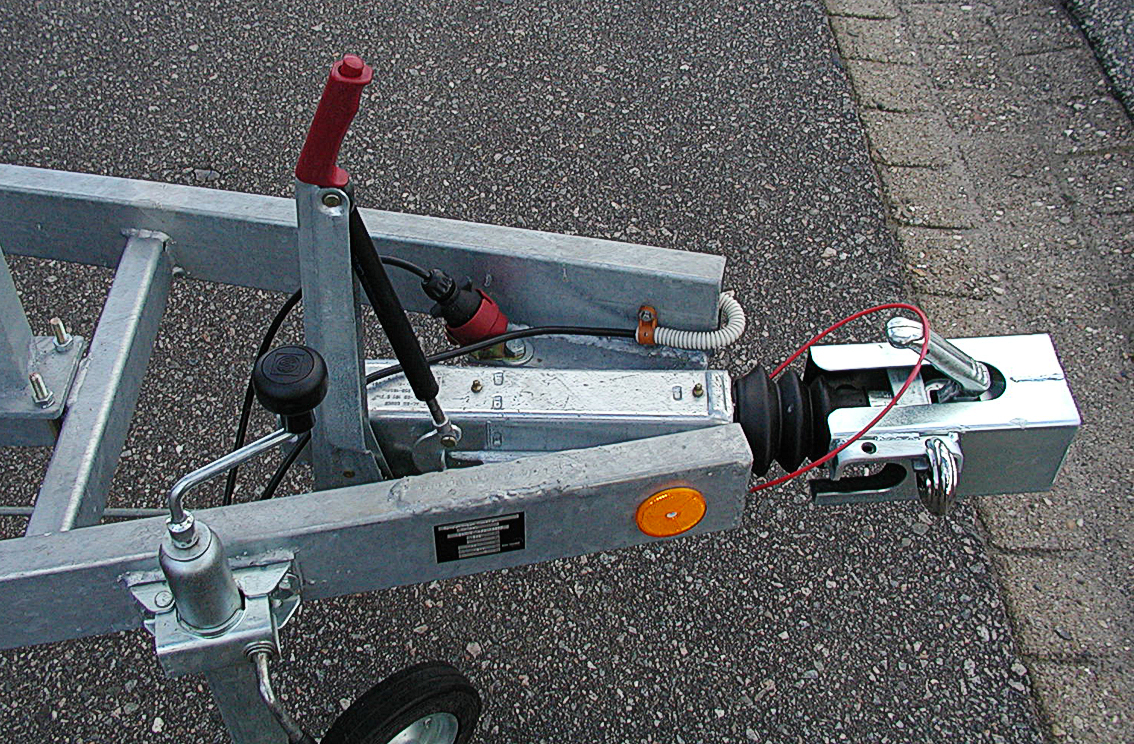
An overrun (inertia) brake coupling with integrated parking brake lever (mechanical version).

An overrun brake—also called an inertia brake or surge brake (in North America for hydraulic versions)—is a brake system that allows a trailer or caravan to brake proportionally to the deceleration of its towing vehicle. The system uses the trailer’s own momentum acting through the coupling to operate its brakes automatically, without a separate electrical or pneumatic control line.

Overrun braking has been widely used in light trailers across Europe, Australia, and New Zealand since the mid-twentieth century, where full air-brake systems are impractical on small trailers. In the United States, surge-type hydraulic actuators serve a similar function for boat and utility trailers.

== History ==
Early mechanical trailer brakes appeared in the 1920s, using crude spring linkages that relied on drawbar compression to pull a rod connected to drum brake levers. By the 1950s, purpose-built “overrun couplings” with sliding drawtubes and integrated dampers were common in European caravans. German manufacturers such as AL-KO Kober and Winterhoff refined these systems into modular products combining coupling head, handbrake lever and damper in one unit.

By the late twentieth century, European construction and safety standards for overrun brakes were codified under ECE Regulation 13 and EU Directive 71/320/EEC, defining performance limits, response times and compatibility with reversing functions.

== Principle of operation ==
The overrun system consists of:

- A control device – the sliding or telescopic coupling housing containing the drawtube and damper;
- A transmission device – a lever and linkage or hydraulic master cylinder that transfers the drawtube movement to the wheel brakes; and
- Wheel brake units – Usually mechanically actuated drums.

When the towing vehicle decelerates, the trailer’s inertia compresses the drawtube inside the coupling housing. This movement rotates or pulls a lever connected to either a brake rod/cable or a hydraulic piston. The energy of compression thus applies braking torque to the trailer wheels. A spring-loaded damper slows the rate of drawtube movement to prevent harsh snatching or “nodding” of the combination.

== Mechanical systems ==
Most small European trailers use purely mechanical overrun brakes employing a steel rod or Bowden cables leading to drum brake backplates. These are sometimes called “inertia mechanical brakes”. The mechanical linkage also doubles as a parking brake when operated by the hand lever integrated into the coupling head.

== Hydraulic (surge) systems ==
Hydraulic overrun, or surge-brake, actuators replace the mechanical linkage with a hydraulic master cylinder that sends fluid pressure to drum or disc brakes on the trailer. This type is widespread in North America, particularly on boat trailers where electric wiring is undesirable in water.

== Reversing systems ==
Because coupling compression also occurs when reversing, several solutions exist to prevent unintentional braking:

- Auto-reverse drum brakes use floating shoes that pivot away when the wheel turns backwards.
- Manual reverse catch—a mechanical pin or latch temporarily disables brake actuation.
- Electric lockout solenoid—in hydraulic actuators, a solenoid valve prevents pressure buildup when the towing vehicle’s reverse light circuit is active.

== Maintenance and inspection ==
Overrun systems require periodic lubrication of the sliding drawtube, checking of damper action, and adjustment of brake cables. Weak or seized dampers cause “trailer snatching” and poor brake balance. Many European roadworthiness tests include a dedicated inertia-brake performance check using a rolling dynamometer or pull-test gauge.

== Advantages and limitations ==
Overrun brakes are simple, self-contained and require no service connection to the towing vehicle other than the coupling. However, they cannot provide independent braking control or proportional braking effort at very low deceleration rates. For this reason, full air- or electrically controlled trailer brakes are mandatory on heavy trailers above roughly 3.5 tonnes GVW in most jurisdictions.

== Applications ==
Overrun systems are fitted to:

- light-duty utility trailers;
- touring caravans and camper trailers;
- military field trailers up to approximately 2 tonnes;
- boat and leisure trailers where hydraulic surge systems are favoured for corrosion resistance.

== Manufacturers ==
Notable commercial producers of overrun couplings and components include:

- AL-KO KOBER Vehicle Technology
- Winterhoff Group
- Knott GmbH
- BPW Bergische Achsen Kommanditgesellschaft
- Dexter Axle Company (North America)

== See also ==
- Tow hitch
- Hydraulic brake
- ECE regulations
