= Trailer connector =

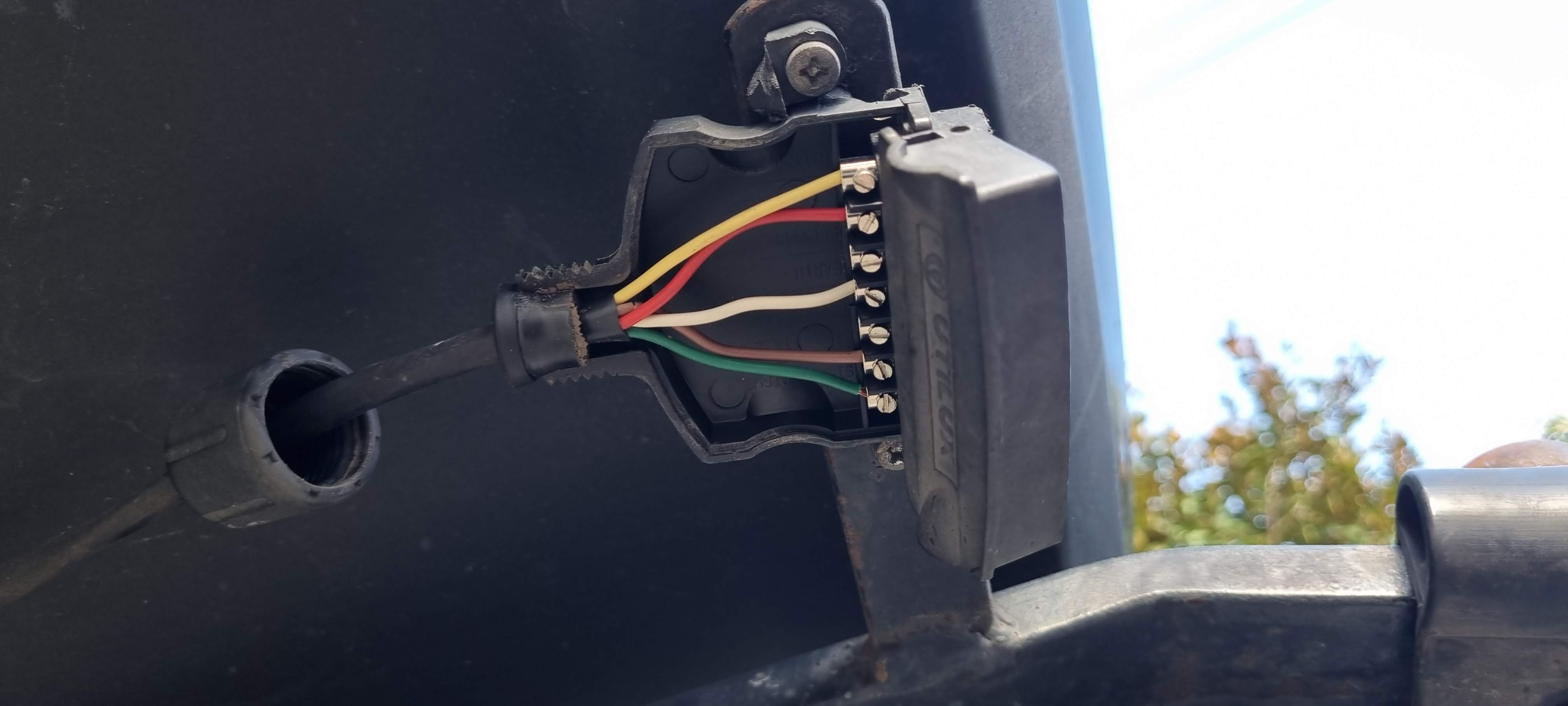
An Australian 7-pin trailer connector, viewed from beneath the vehicle.

A trailer connector (also referred to as a "trailer wire," "trailer cable," or "trailer connecting cable") is a multi-pole electrical connector between a towing vehicle (car, truck) and a trailer. It is intended primarily to supply automotive lighting on the trailer, but it also provides management and supply to other loads. The connector offers feedback from the trailer to the towing vehicle, ranging from a fault indication for ABS brakes to advanced command, monitor and control using CAN bus for EBS brakes. ISO standards are available.

== Variants ==
- Trailer connectors in Europe
- Trailer connectors in North America
- Trailer connectors in Australia
- Trailer connectors in military organizations
