= DIN 72552 =

Standard for labeling automotive electric terminals

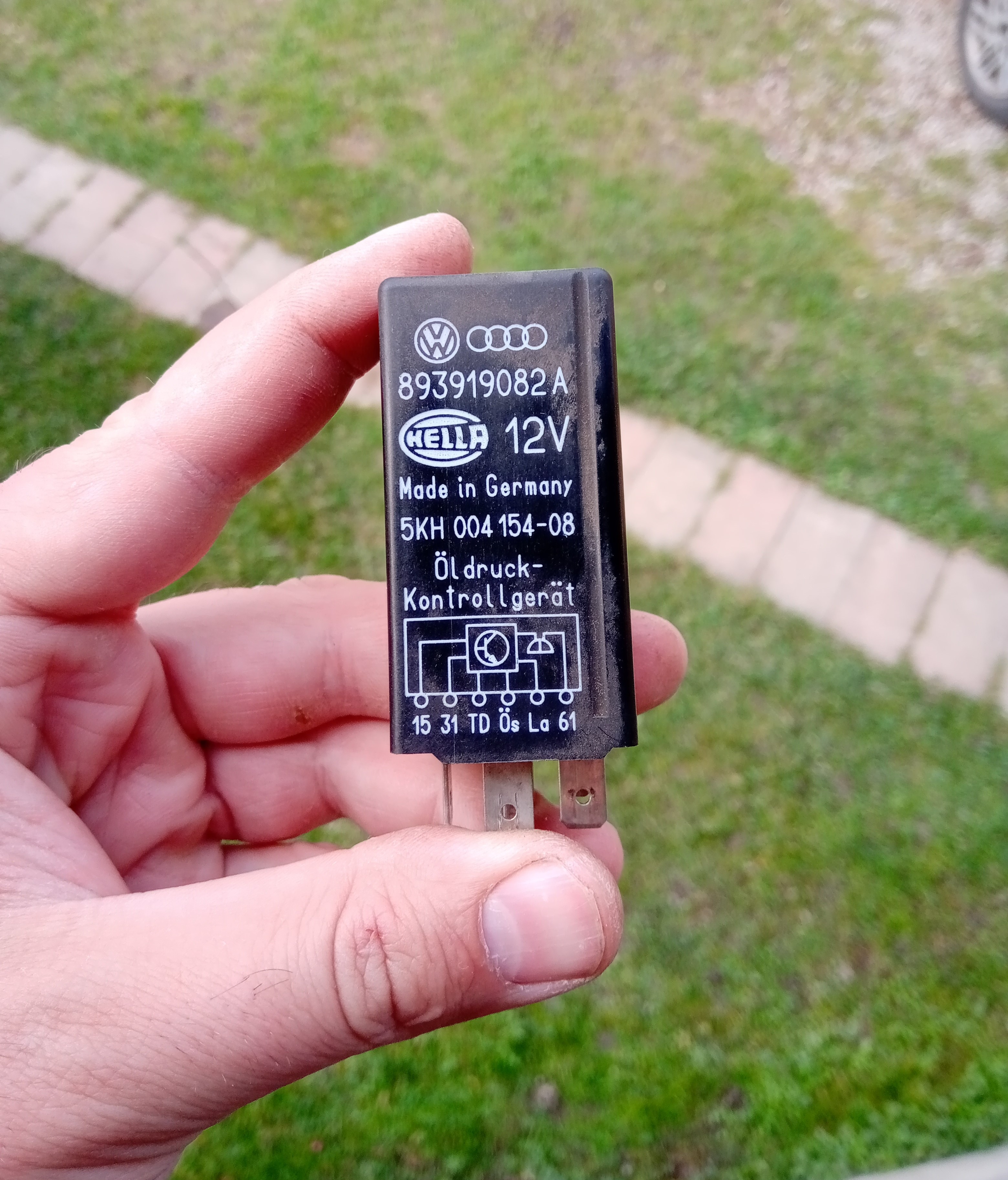
VAG car relay

DIN 72552 is a DIN standard for labeling the electric terminals in automotive wiring. The most frequently used labels are listed in the table below.

Contact	Meaning	Old terminal designation
Ignition system
1	ignition coil, distributor, low voltage
1a, 1b	distributor with two separate circuits
2	breaker points magneto ignition
4	coil, distributor, high voltage
4a, 4b	distributor with two separate circuits, high voltage
7	terminal on ballast resistor, to distributor
15	battery+ from ignition switch	16
15a	from ballast resistor to coil and starter motor	16
15e	battery+ from ignition switch, also when starter motor runs
Preheat (Diesel engines)
15	preheat in	+
17	start
19	preheat (glow)
Starter
45	starter relay	30f, 30h
45a	starter 1 output	30h, 30h I
45b	starter 2 output	30h II
50	starter control
50a	starter control
50b	starter control	50
50c	starter control	50 II
50d	starter control	50b, 50k
50e	starter control	50a
50f	starter control	50
50g	starter control	50a
50h	starter control	50
Battery
15	battery+ through ignition switch	16, 54/15
30	from battery+ direct	30/51
30a	from 2nd battery and 12/24 V relay
31	return to battery- or direct to ground
31a	return to battery- 12/24 V relay
31b	return to battery- or ground through switch	85d
31c	return to battery- 12/24 V relay	31, 31a
Electric motors
32	return	31
33	main terminal (swap of 32 and 33 is possible)	30
33a	limit
33b	field	54e
33f	2. slow rpm
33g	3. slow rpm
33h	4. slow rpm
33L	rotation left	30L
33R	rotation right	30R
Indicators
49	flasher unit in	15, 15+, 15/54, +, +15, X
49a	flasher unit out, indicator switch in	54L, S, S4, L
49b	out 2. flasher circuit
49c	out 3. flasher circuit
C	1st flasher indicator light	K, K1, P
C2	2nd flasher indicator light	K1, K2, K3, K4
C3	3rd flasher indicator light	K3, K4
L	indicator lights left	HL, L54, VL
R	indicator lights right	HR, R54, VR
L54	lights out, left	SBL
R54	lights out, right	SBR
AC generator
51	DC at rectifiers
51e	as 51, with choke coil
59	AC out, rectifier in, light switch	51, 51-, 51a
59a	charge, rotor out	59
64	generator control light
Generator, voltage regulator
61	charge indicator (charge control light)
B+	battery +	51, 51B+, B+30, B+51
B-	battery -	31B-
D+	dynamo/alternator diode+
D-	dynamo/alternator diode-
DF	dynamo field
DF1	dynamo field 1
DF2	dynamo field 2
U, V, W	AC three phase terminals
Lights
54	brake lights
54g	lights	54
55	fog light	N
56	spot light
56a	headlamp high beam and indicator light
56b	low beam	F
56d	signal flash
57	parking lights
57a	parking lights	P
57L	parking lights left	PL
57R	parking lights right	PR
58	licence plate lights, instrument panel
58d	panel light dimmer	58b
58L	parking light	58
58R	parking light	58
Window wiper/washer
53	wiper motor + in	1, 3, 54d, S
53a	limit stop +	54, +2
53b	limit stop field	3, 54e
53c	washer pump
53e	stop field	1, 2
53i	wiper motor with permanent magnet, third brush for high speed
Acoustic warning
71	beeper in	H
71a	beeper out, low
71b	beeper out, high
72	hazard lights switch
85c	hazard sound on
Switches
81	opener
81a	1 out
81b	2 out
82	lock in
82a	1st out
82b	2nd out
82z	1st in
82y	2nd in
83	multi position switch, in
83a	out position 1
83b	out position 2
Relay
85	relay coil -	Important if relay coil has flyback diode in parallel
86	relay coil +	Important if relay coil has diode in parallel
Relay contacts
87	common contact	30/51
87a	normally closed contact
87b	normally open contact
88	common contact 2	30/51 (relay)
88a	normally closed contact 2
88b	normally open contact 2
Additional
52	signal from trailer
54g	magnetic valves for trailer brakes
75	radio, cigarette lighter	R
77	door valves control

== EN 50005 ==
A different standard, European Norm (EN) 50005 recommends terminal numbering for general application relays (e.g. 11/12/14/A1/A2 for a SPDT relay) that may nevertheless be applied to automobiles.
