= Trailer (vehicle) =

Towed cargo vehicle

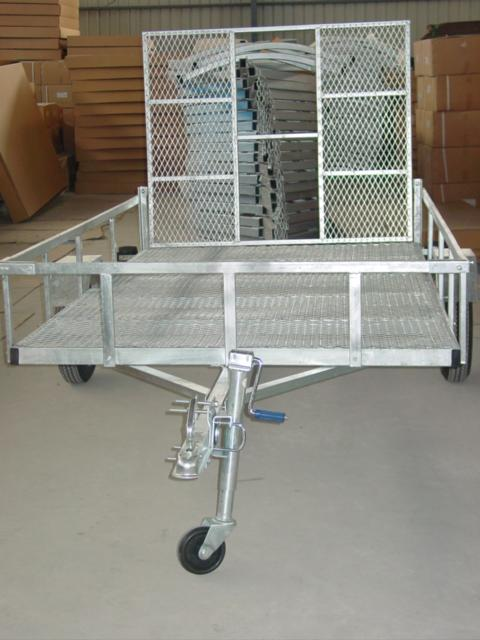
Utility trailer with a folded loading ramp

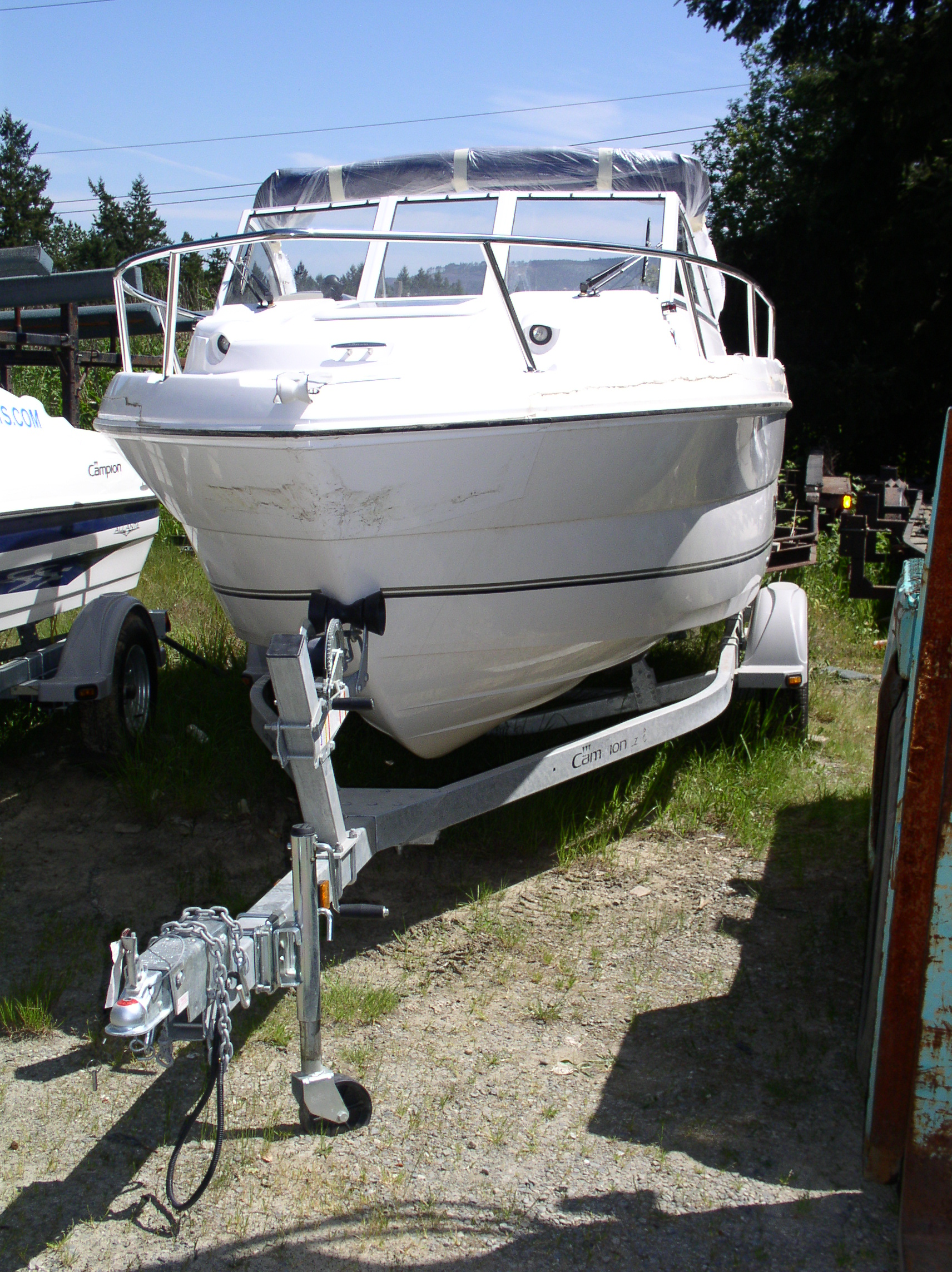
A boat on a single-axle trailer

A trailer is an unpowered vehicle towed by a powered vehicle. It is commonly used for transporting goods and materials. There are two general categories of trailers: the full trailer and the semitrailer. A full trailer is a type of trailer whose entire weight is supported by its own wheels, with no weight transferred to the towing vehicle. In contrast, a semi-trailer is designed so that a portion of its weight is carried by its own wheels, while the remaining weight is borne by the towing vehicle.

Sometimes recreational vehicles, travel trailers, or mobile homes with limited living facilities where people can camp or stay have been referred to as trailers. In earlier days, many such vehicles were towable trailers.

Trailers have been used for thousands of years, predating the invention of the automobile. Before the advent of the wheel, early humans employed the concept of trailering by using drag sleds to transport goods. While the two-wheeled war chariot is one of the earliest and simplest forms of a semi-trailer, Alexander Winston has been credited with inventing the modern semitrailer in Cleveland, Ohio.

== United States ==
In the United States, the term is sometimes used interchangeably with travel trailer and mobile home, varieties of trailers and manufactured housing designed for human habitation. Their origins lay in utility trailers built in a similar fashion to horse-drawn wagons. A trailer park is an area where mobile homes are placed for habitation.

In the United States trailers ranging in size from single-axle dollies and bumper pulled trailers to 6-axle, 13-foot-6-inch-high (4.1 m), 53-foot-long (16.2 m) semi-trailers are commonplace. The latter, when towed as part of a tractor-trailer or "18-wheeler", carries a large percentage of the freight that travels over land in North America.

== Types ==
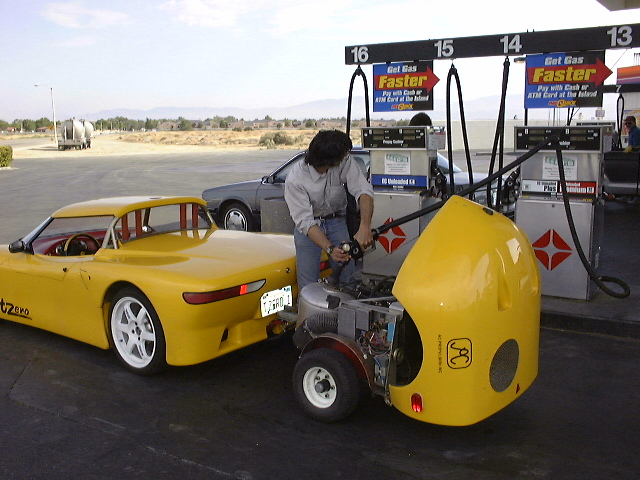
ACP Backtracking genset trailer

Some trailers are made for personal (or small business) use with practically any powered vehicle having an appropriate hitch, but some trailers are part of large trucks called semi-trailer trucks for transportation of cargo.

Enclosed toy trailers and motorcycle trailers can be towed by commonly accessible pickup truck or van, which generally require no special permit beyond a regular driver's license. Specialized trailers like open-air motorcycle trailers and bicycle trailers are much smaller, accessible to small automobiles, and, like some simple trailers, have a drawbar and ride on a single axle. Other trailers, such as utility trailers and travel trailers or campers come in single- and multiple-axle varieties to allow for varying sizes of tow vehicles.

There also exist highly specialized trailers, such as genset trailers, pusher trailers and other types that are also used to power the towing vehicle. Others are custom-built to hold entire kitchens and other specialized equipment used by carnival vendors. There are also trailers for hauling boats.

=== Trackless train ===
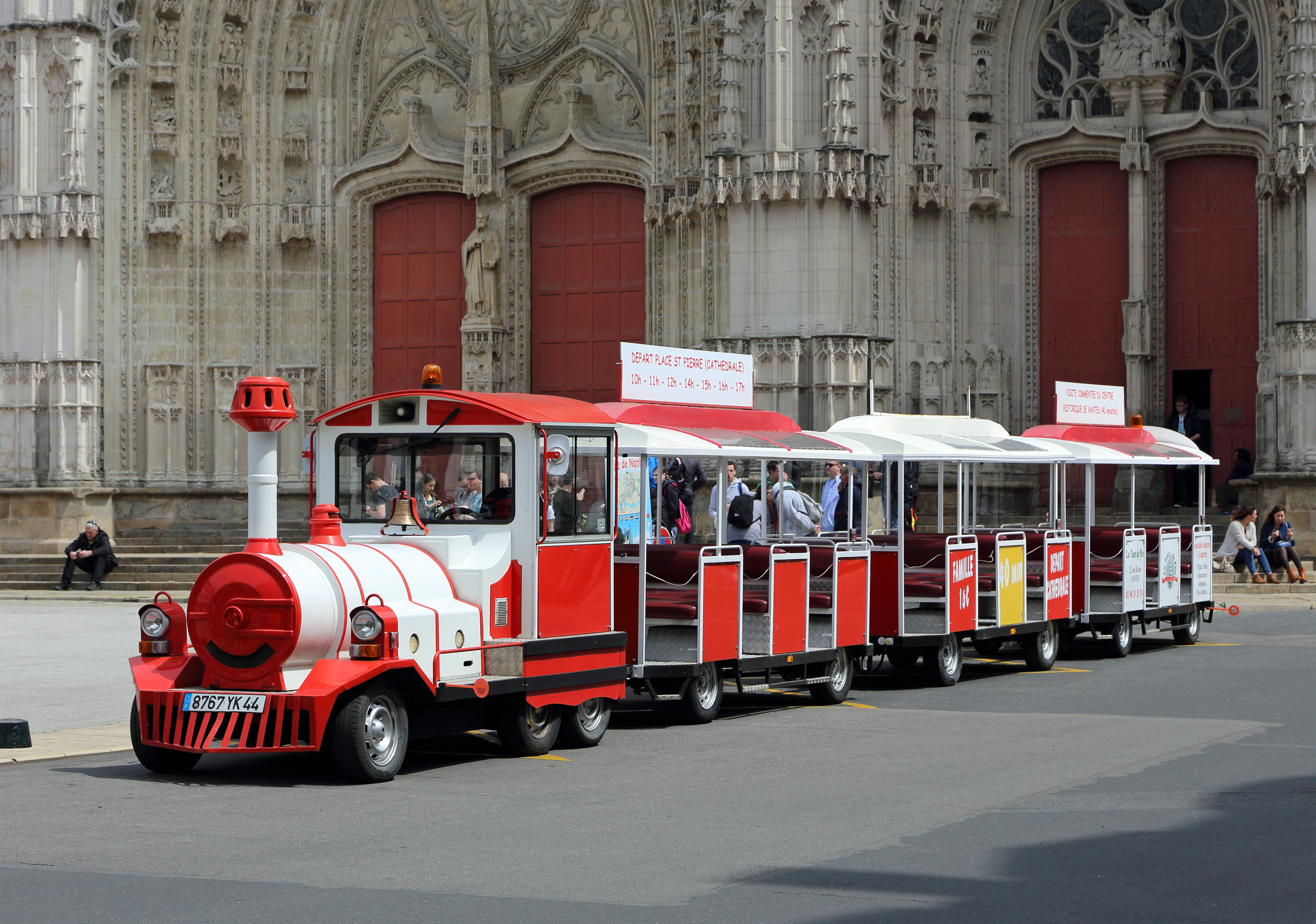
Touristic road train in Nantes, France. It has three trailers.

=== Utility ===
A utility trailer is a general-purpose trailer designed to be towed by a light vehicle and to carry light, compact loads of up to a few metric tonnes. It typically has short metal sides (either rigid or folding) to constrain the load, and may have cage sides and a rear folding gate or ramps. Utility trailers do not have a roof. Utility trailers have one axle set comprising one, two or three axles. If it does not have sides then it is usually called a flatbed or flat-deck trailer. If it has rails rather than sides, with ramps at the rear, it is usually called an open car transporter, auto-transporter, or a plant trailer, as they are designed to transport vehicles and mobile plant. If it has fully rigid sides and a roof with a rear door, creating a weatherproof compartment, this is usually called a furniture trailer, cargo trailer, box van trailer or box trailer.

=== Fixed plant ===
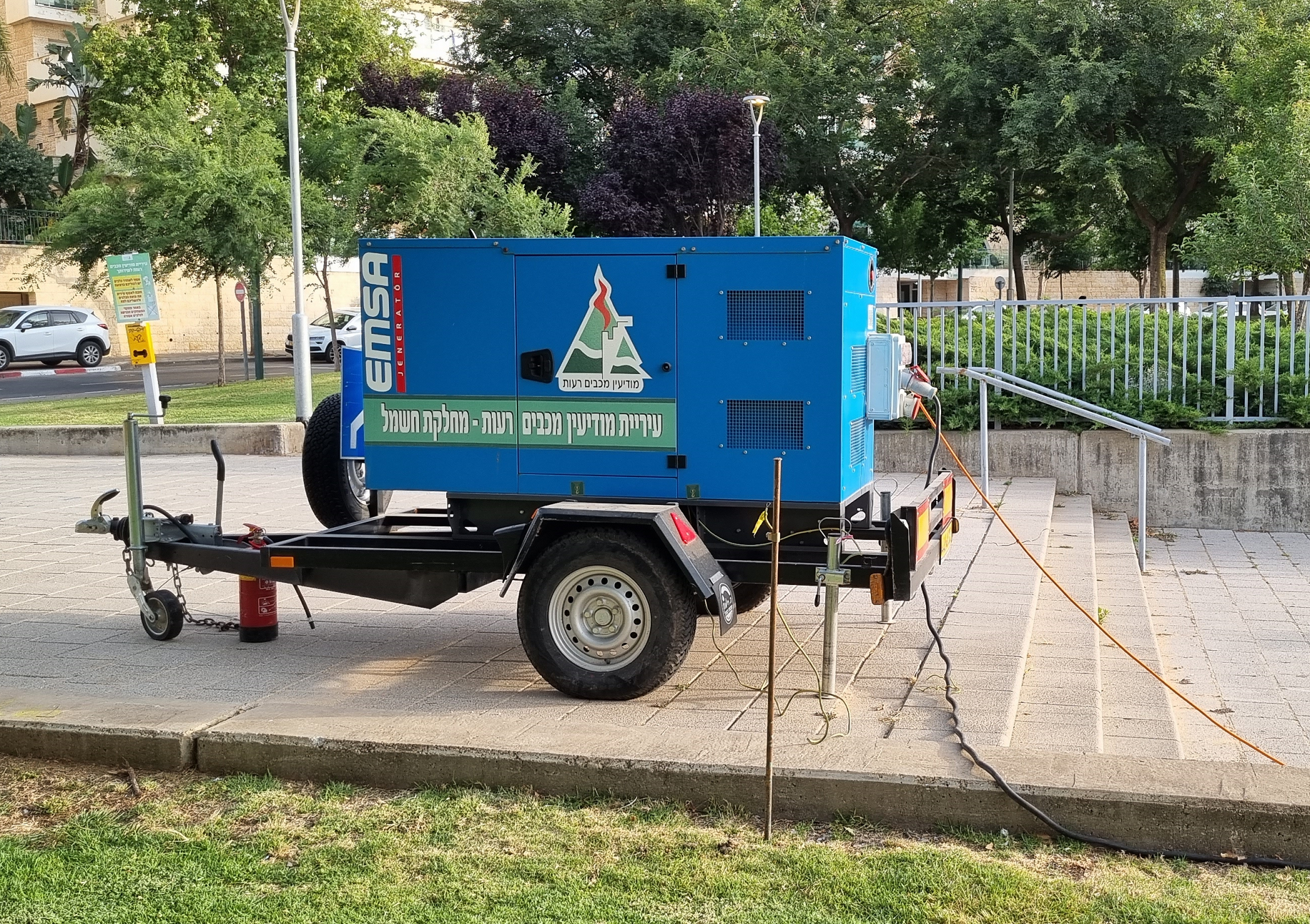
Towable EMSA generator of Modiin Municipality

A fixed-plant trailer is a special-purpose trailer built to carry units which usually are immobile, such as large generators & pumps.

=== Bicycle ===
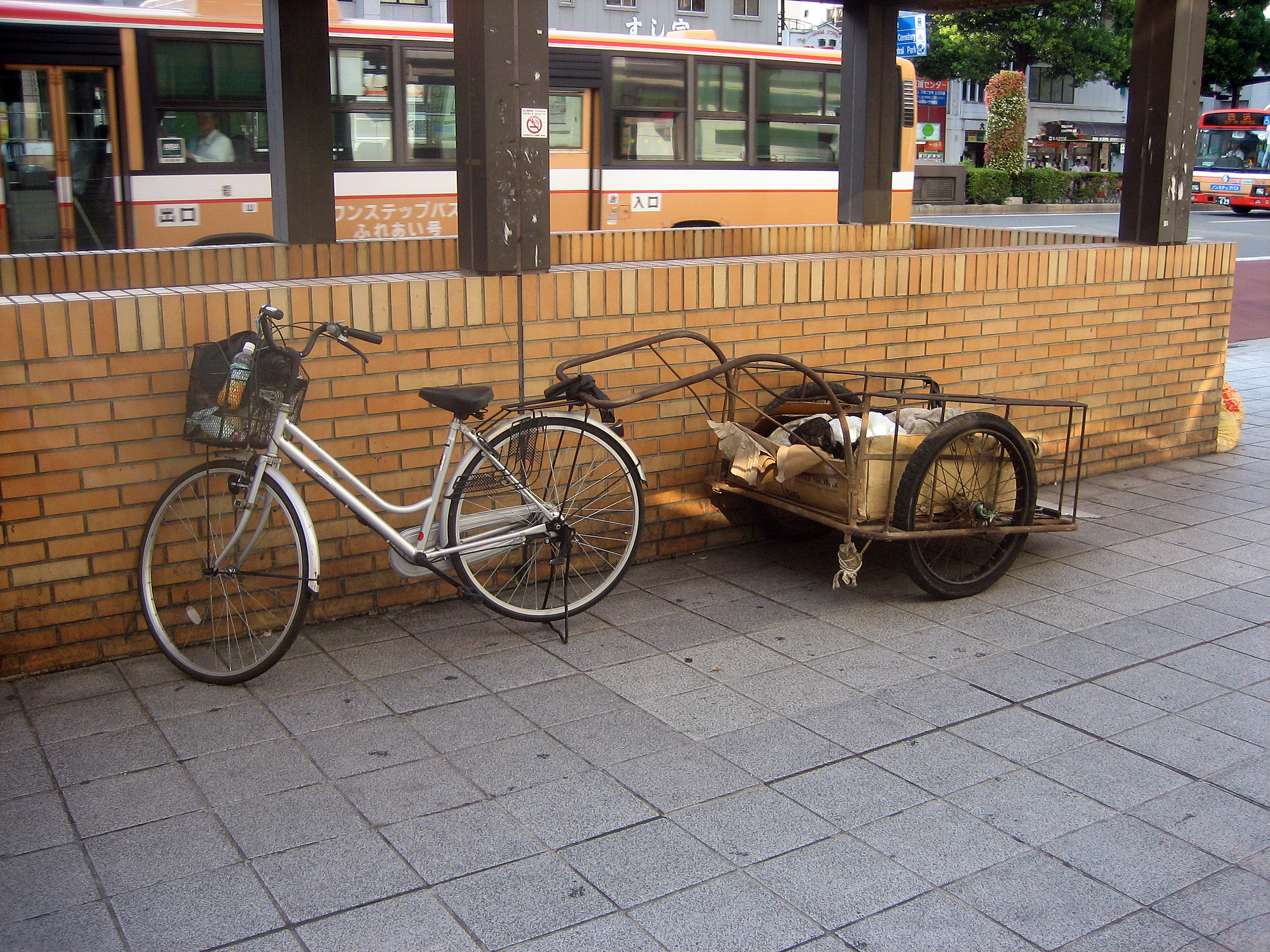
Bicycle trailer of Japan

A bicycle trailer is a motorless wheeled frame with a hitch system for transporting cargo by bicycle.

=== Construction ===
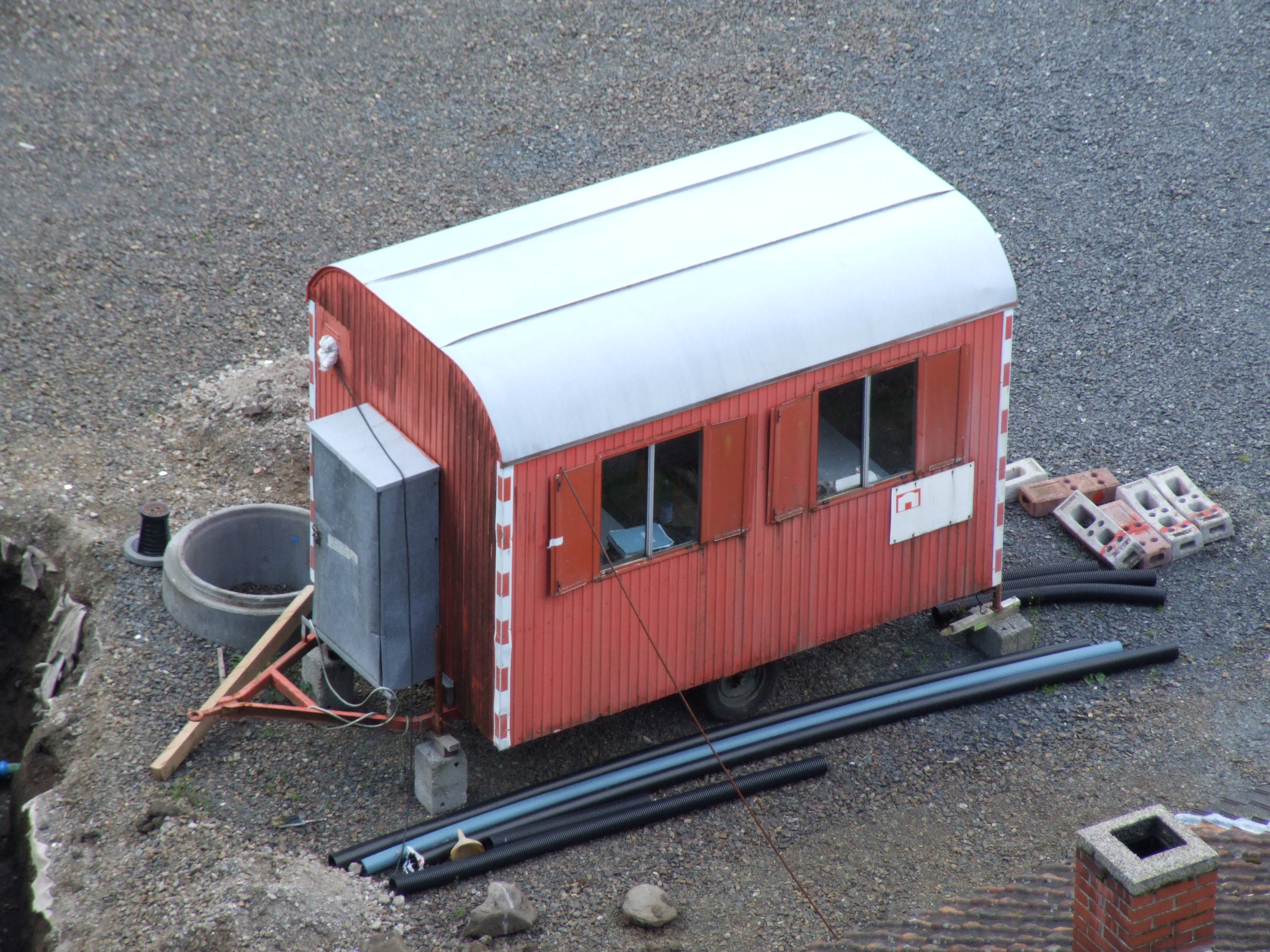
Construction trailer

Construction trailers are mobile structures (trailers) used to accommodate temporary offices, dining facilities and storage of building materials during construction projects. The trailers may be equipped with radios for communication.

=== Travel ===
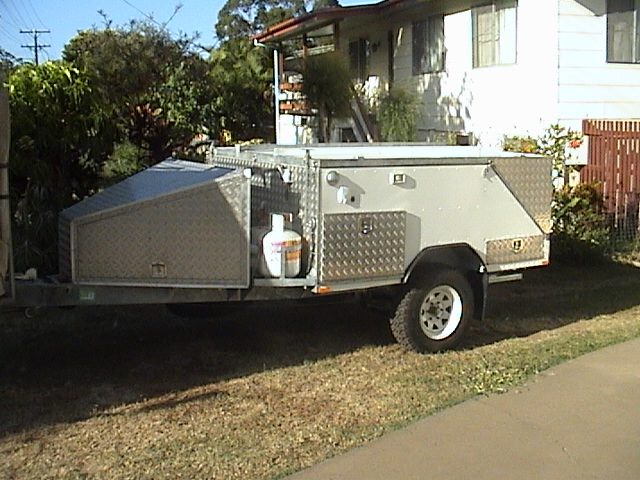
A custom-made popup camper trailer

Popular campers use lightweight trailers, aerodynamic trailers that can be towed by a small car, such as the BMW Air Camper. They are built to be lower than the tow vehicle, minimizing drag.

Others range from two-axle campers that can be pulled by most mid-sized pickups to trailers that are as long as the host country's law allows for drivers without special permits, with the largest, such as trailers from Spacecraft, ranging from 40 to 57 ft (12.1 to 17.4 m) long semi-trailers that require a heavy-duty tractor unit as the towing vehicle due to their weight and use of air brakes. Larger campers tend to be fully integrated recreational vehicles, which often are used to tow single-axle dolly trailers and enclosed car trailers to allow the users to bring small cars on their travels.

=== Semi ===
A semi-trailer is a trailer without a front axle. A large proportion of its weight is supported either by a road tractor or by a detachable front axle assembly known as a dolly. A semi-trailer is normally equipped with legs, called "landing gear", which can be lowered to support it when it is uncoupled. In the United States, a single trailer cannot exceed a length of 57 ft 0 in (17.37 m) on interstate highways (unless a special permit is granted), although it is possible to link two smaller trailers together to a maximum length of 63 ft 0 in (19.20 m).

Semi-trailers vary considerably in design, ranging from open-topped grain haulers through Tautliners to normal-looking but refrigerated 13 ft 6 in (4.11 m) x 53 ft 0 in (16.15 m) enclosures ("reefers"). Many semi-trailers are part of semi-trailer trucks. Other types of semi-trailers include dry vans, flatbeds, campers, and chassis.

Many commercial organizations choose to rent or lease semi-trailer equipment rather than own their own semi-trailers, to free up capital and to keep trailer debt from appearing on their balance sheet.

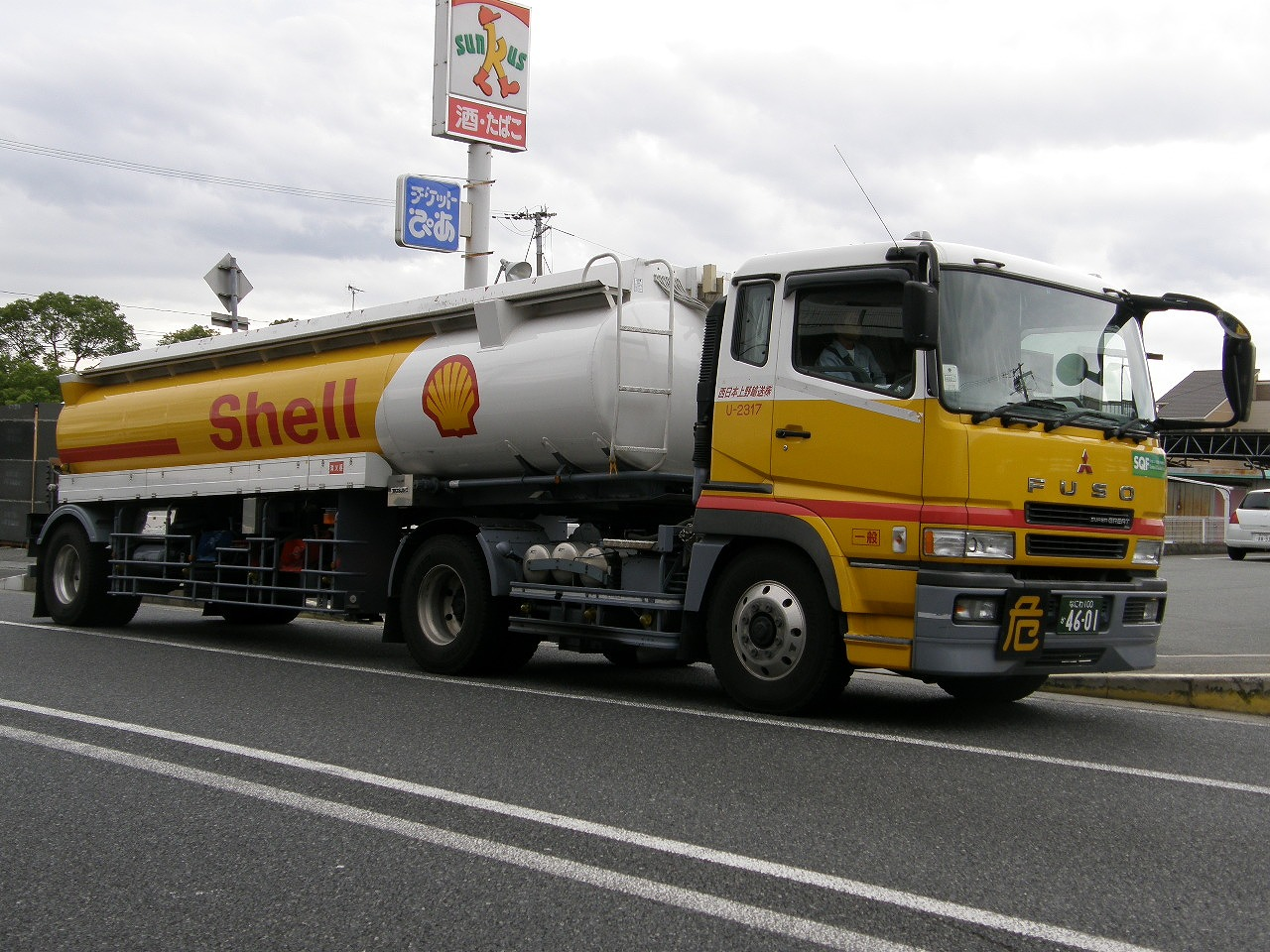
Semi tank trailer in Japan

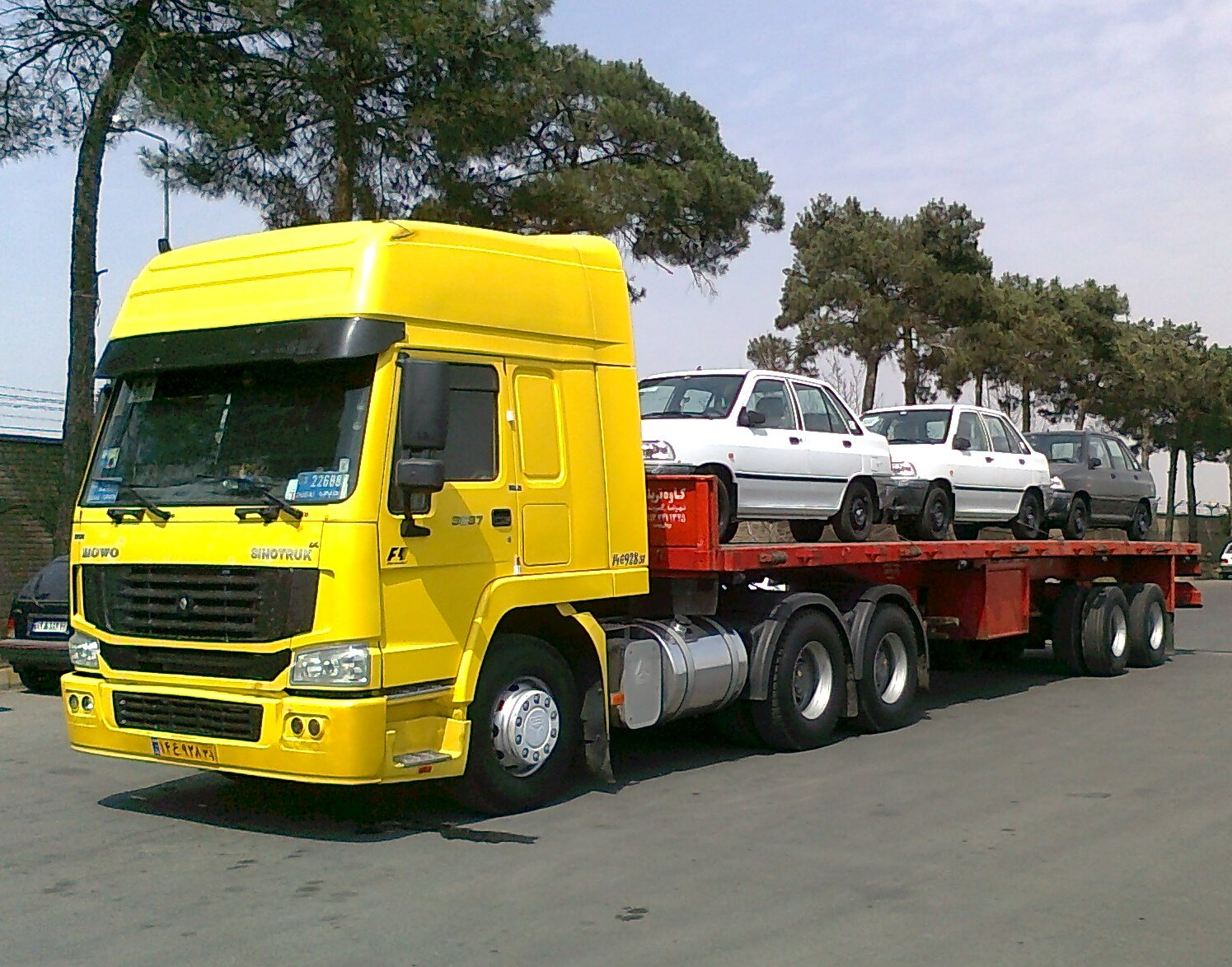
SinoTruk HOWO with flatbed trailer

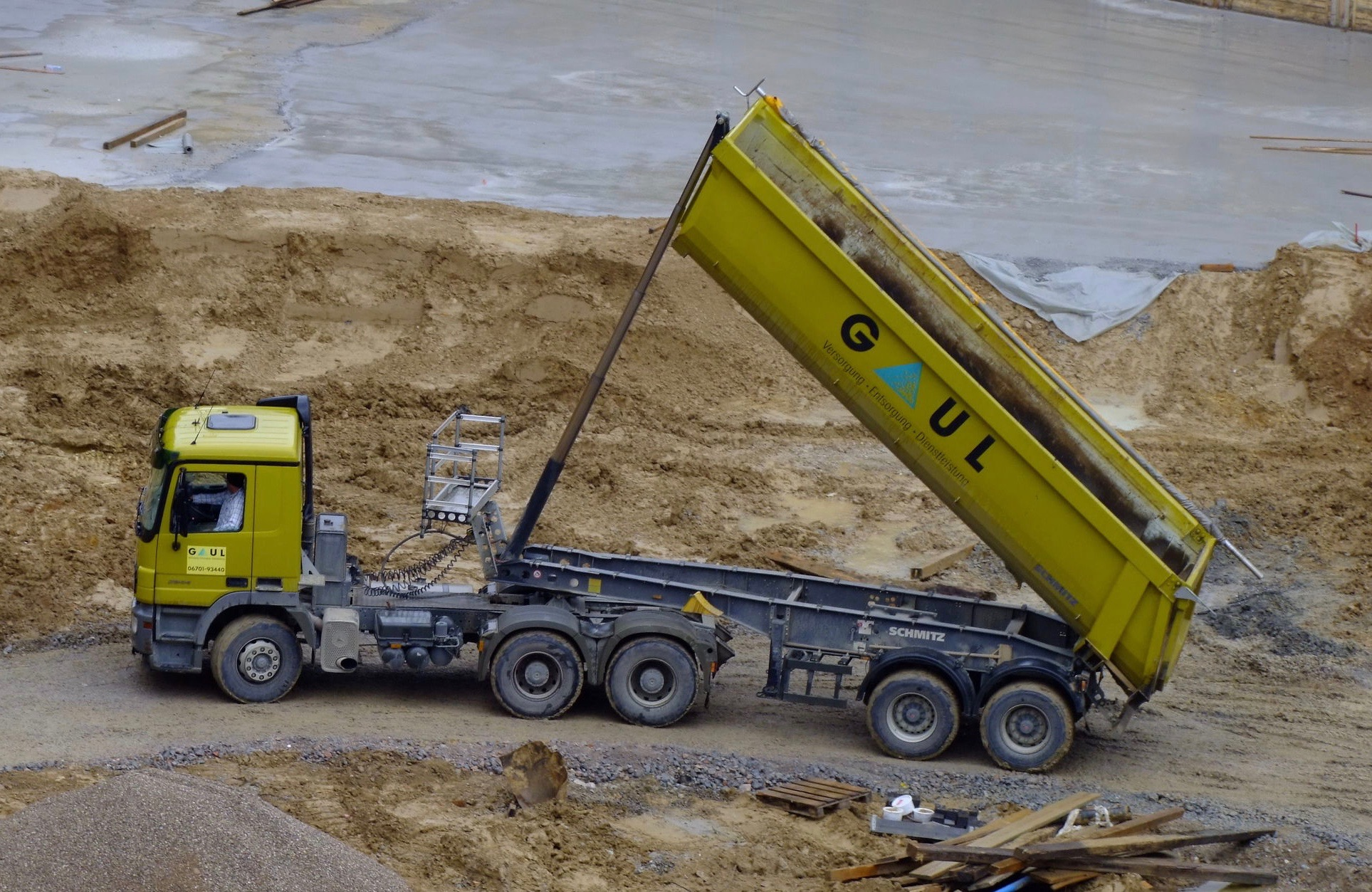
LKW Kipper dump trailer

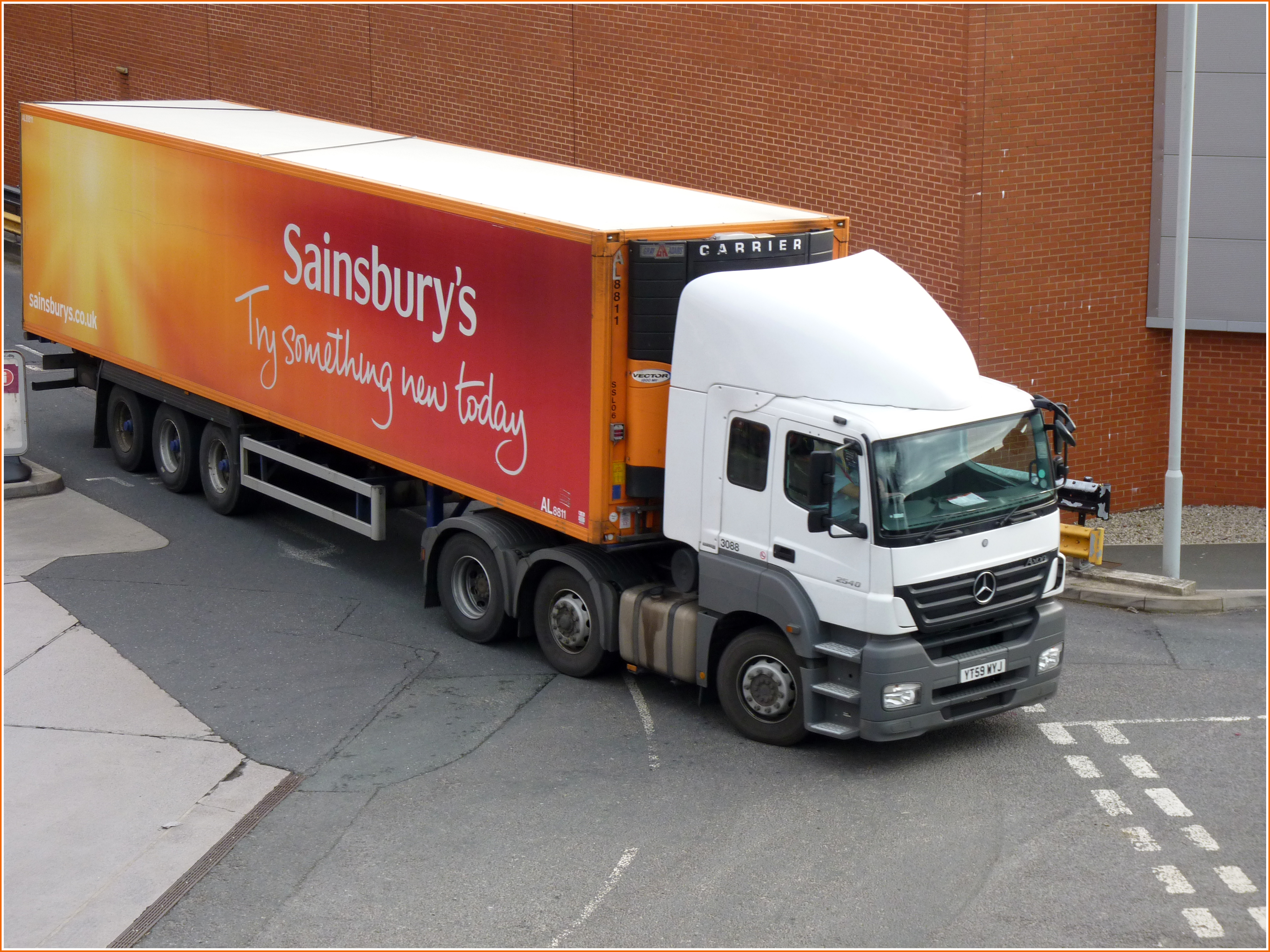
Sainsbury's refrigerated trailer made by Gray & Adams

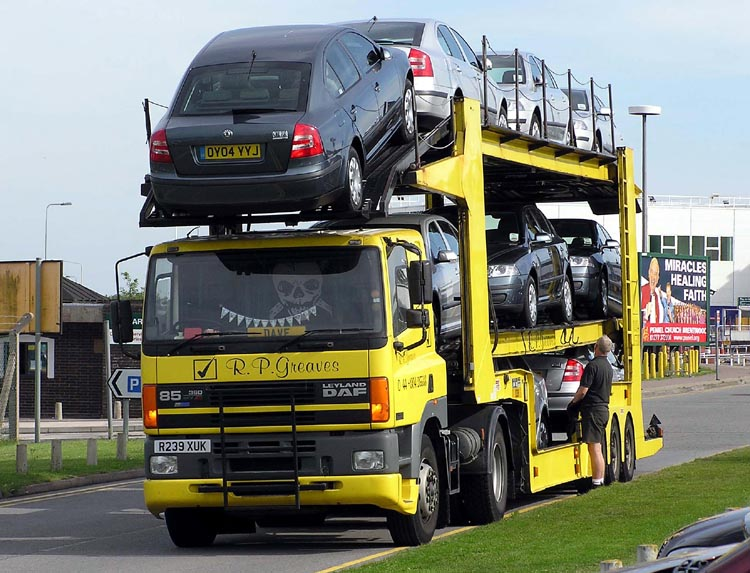
A car carrier trailer

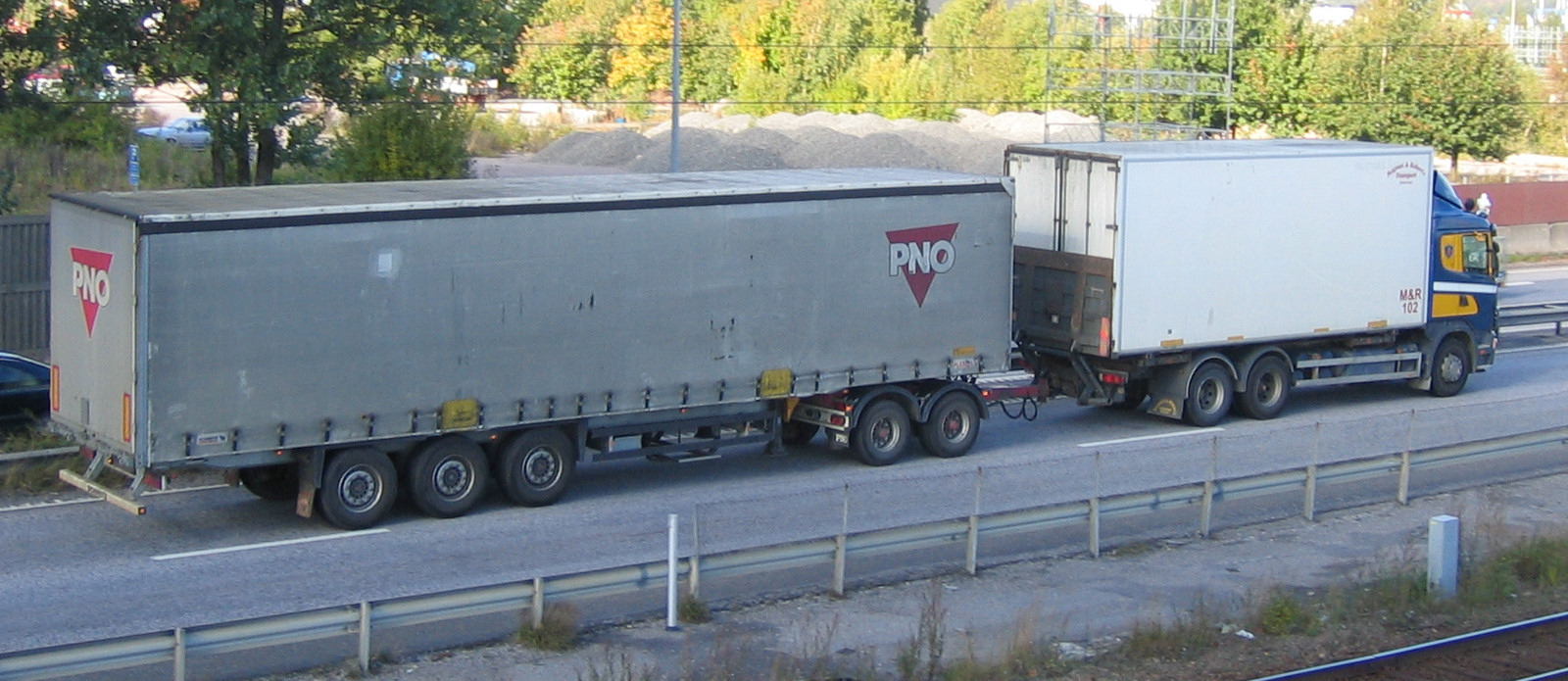
A truck pulling a semi-trailer using a trailer Dolly

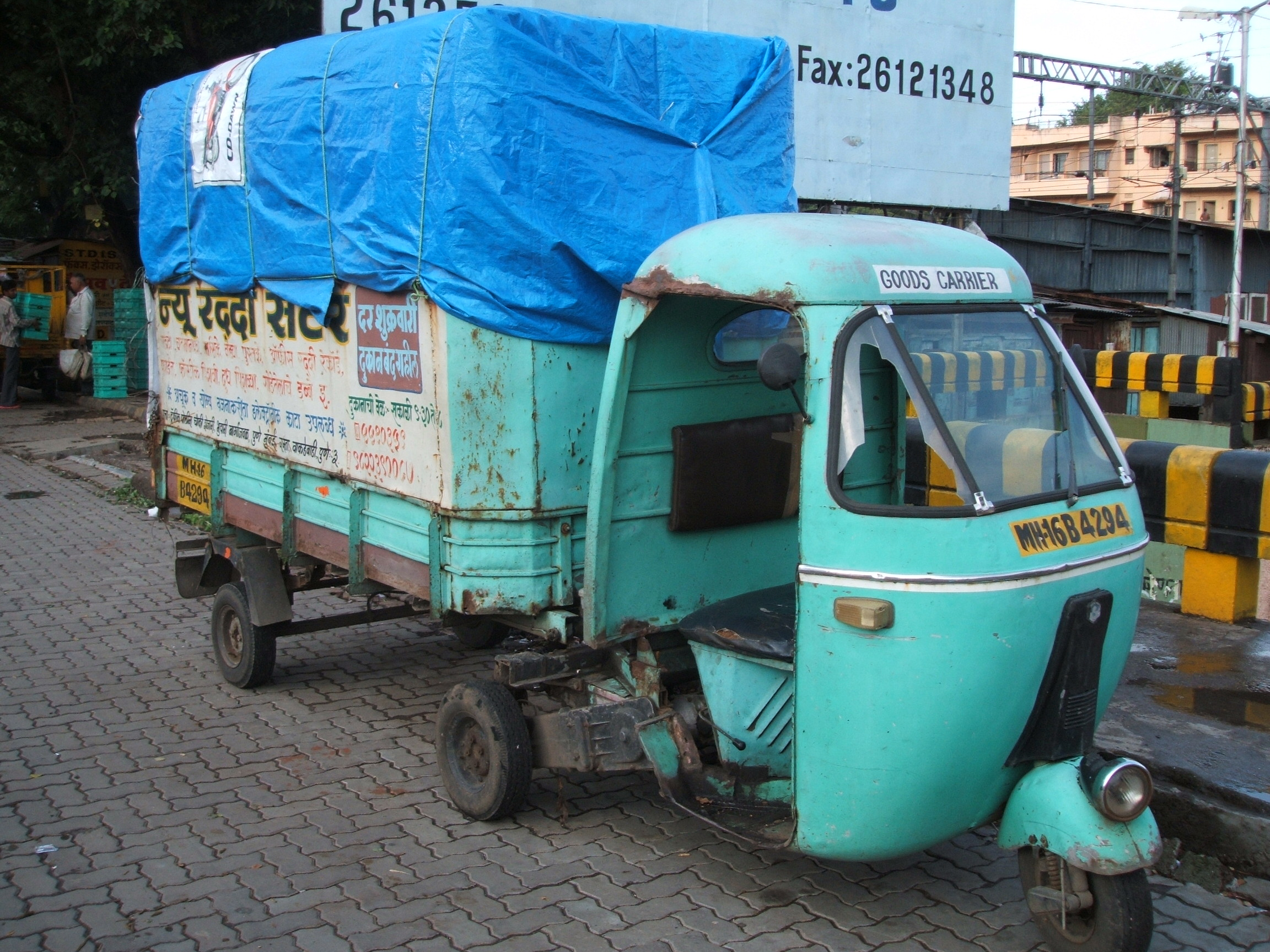
Indian auto-rickshaw adapted with trailer

=== Full ===
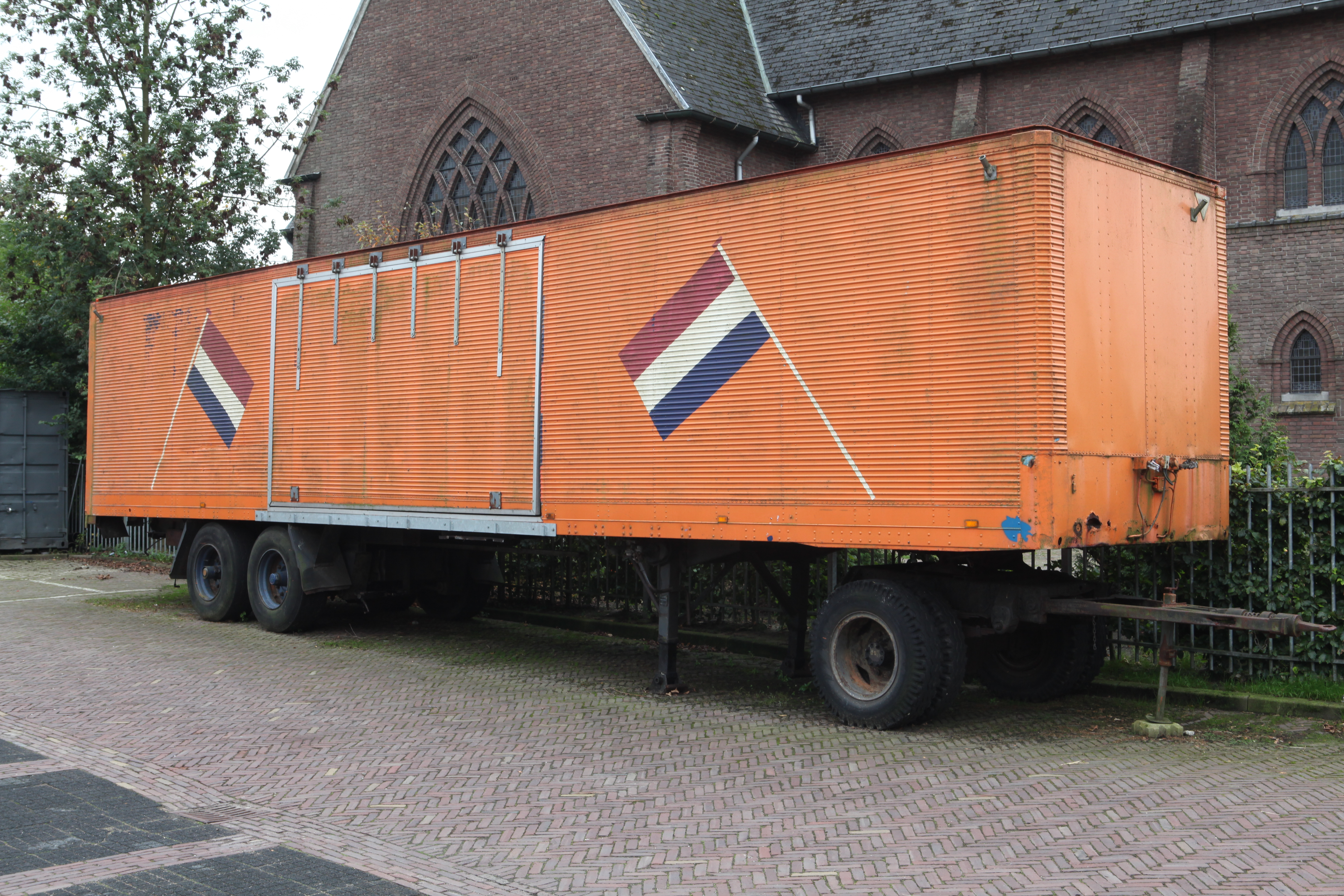
Full trailer with steered axle

A full trailer is a term used in the United States and New Zealand for a freight trailer supported by front and rear axles and pulled by a drawbar. In Europe this is known as an A-frame drawbar trailer, and in Australia it is known as a dog trailer. Commercial freight trailers are produced to length and width specifications defined by the country of operation. In America this is 96 or 102 in (2.4 or 2.6 m) wide and 35 or 40 ft (11 or 12 m) long. In New Zealand, the maximum width is 2.55 m (100 in) while the maximum length is 11.5 m (38 ft), giving a 22-pallet capacity.

As per AIS 053, a full trailer is a towed vehicle having at least two axles, and equipped with a towing device which can move vertically in relation to the trailer and controls the direction of the front axle(s), but which transmits no significant static load to the towing vehicle. Common types of full trailers are flat deck, hardside/box, curtainside or bathtub tipper style with axle configurations up to two at the drawbar end and three at the rear of the trailer.

This style of trailer is also popular for use with farm tractors.

=== Close-coupled ===
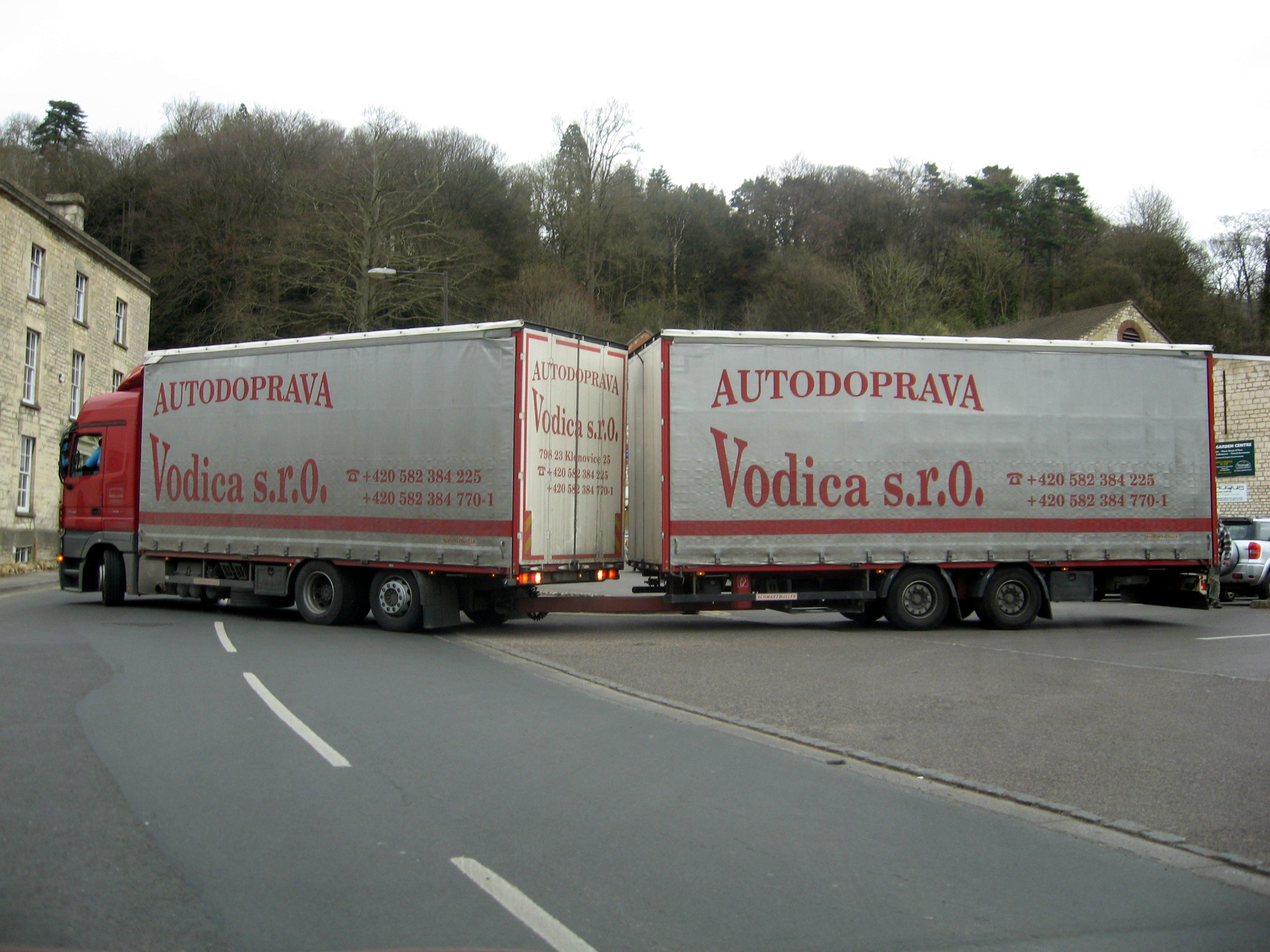
A close-coupled trailer

A close-coupled trailer is fitted with a rigid towbar which projects from its front and hooks onto a hook on the tractor. It does not pivot as a drawbar does.

=== Motorcycle ===
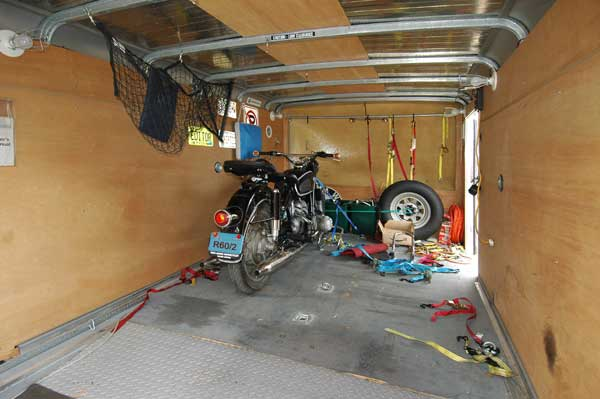
Interior of an enclosed motorcycle trailer

A motorcycle trailer may be a trailer designed to haul motorcycles behind an automobile or truck. Such trailers may be open or enclosed, ranging in size from trailers capable of carrying several motorcycles or only one. They may be designed specifically to carry motorcycles, with ramps and tie-downs, or may be a utility trailer adapted permanently or occasionally to haul one or more motorcycles.

Another sense of "motorcycle trailer" is a wheeled frame with a hitch system designed for transporting cargo by motorcycle. Motorcycle trailers are often narrow and styled to match the appearance of the motorcycle they are intended to be towed behind. There are two-wheeled versions and single-wheeled versions. Single-wheeled trailers, such as the Unigo or Pav 40/41, are designed to allow the bike to have all the normal flexibility of a motorcycle, usually using a universal joint to enable the trailer to lean and turn with the motorcycle. No motorcycle manufacturer recommends that its motorcycles be used to tow a trailer because it results in additional safety hazards for motorcyclists.

=== Livestock ===
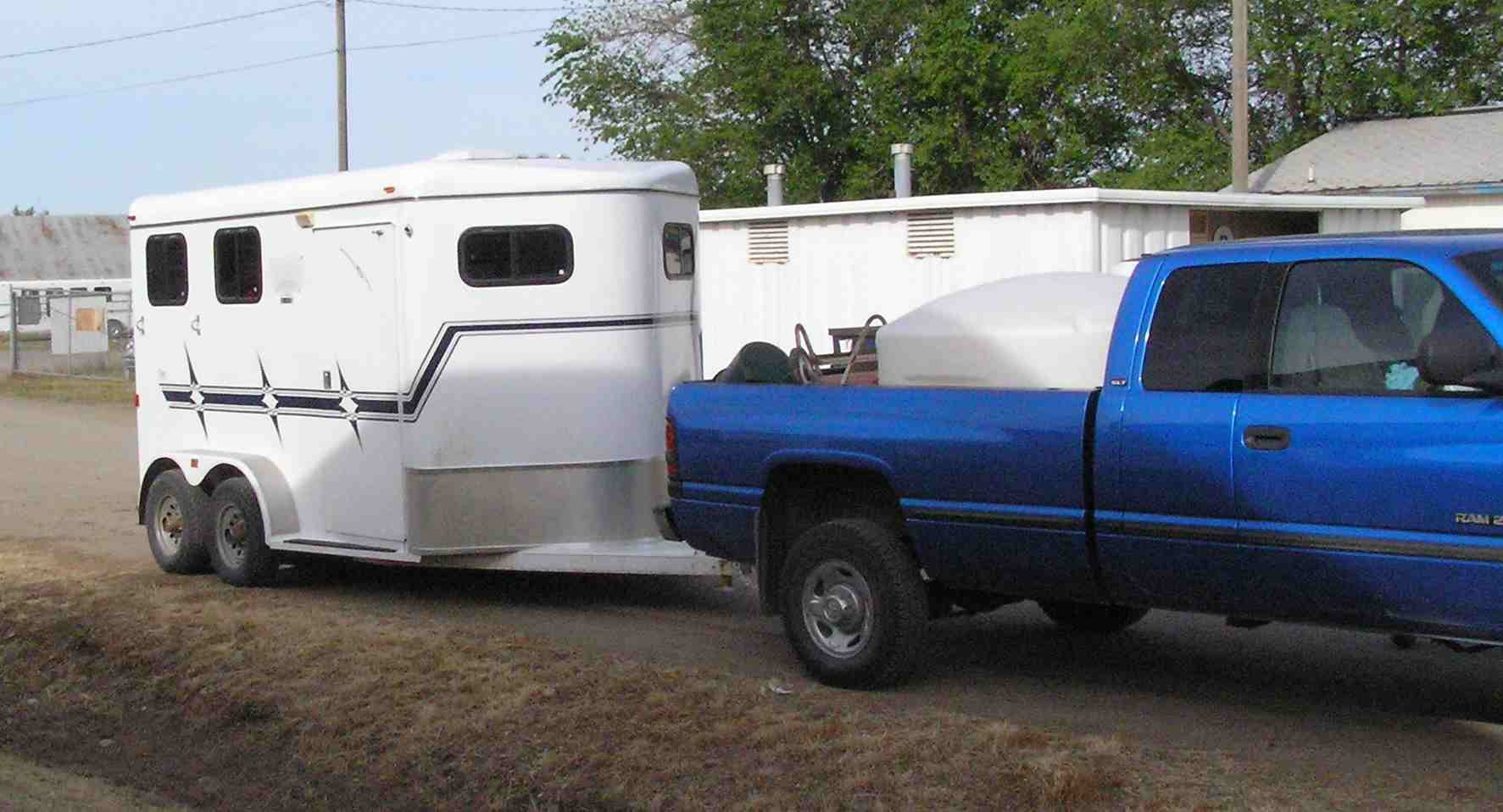
A horse trailer

There are a number of different styles of trailers used to haul livestock such as cattle, horses, sheep and pigs. The most common is the stock trailer, also known as a bull hauler—a trailer that is enclosed on the bottom, but has openings at approximately the eye level of the animals to allow ventilation. The horse trailer is a more elaborate form of stock trailer. Because horses are usually hauled for the purpose of competition or work, where they must be in peak physical condition, horse trailers are designed for the comfort and safety of the animals. They usually have adjustable vents and windows as well as suspension designed to provide a smooth ride and less stress on the animals. In addition, horse trailers have internal partitions that assist the animal in staying upright during travel and protect horses from injuring each other in transit. Larger horse trailers may incorporate additional storage areas for horse tack and may even include elaborate living quarters with sleeping areas, bathroom and cooking facilities, and other comforts.

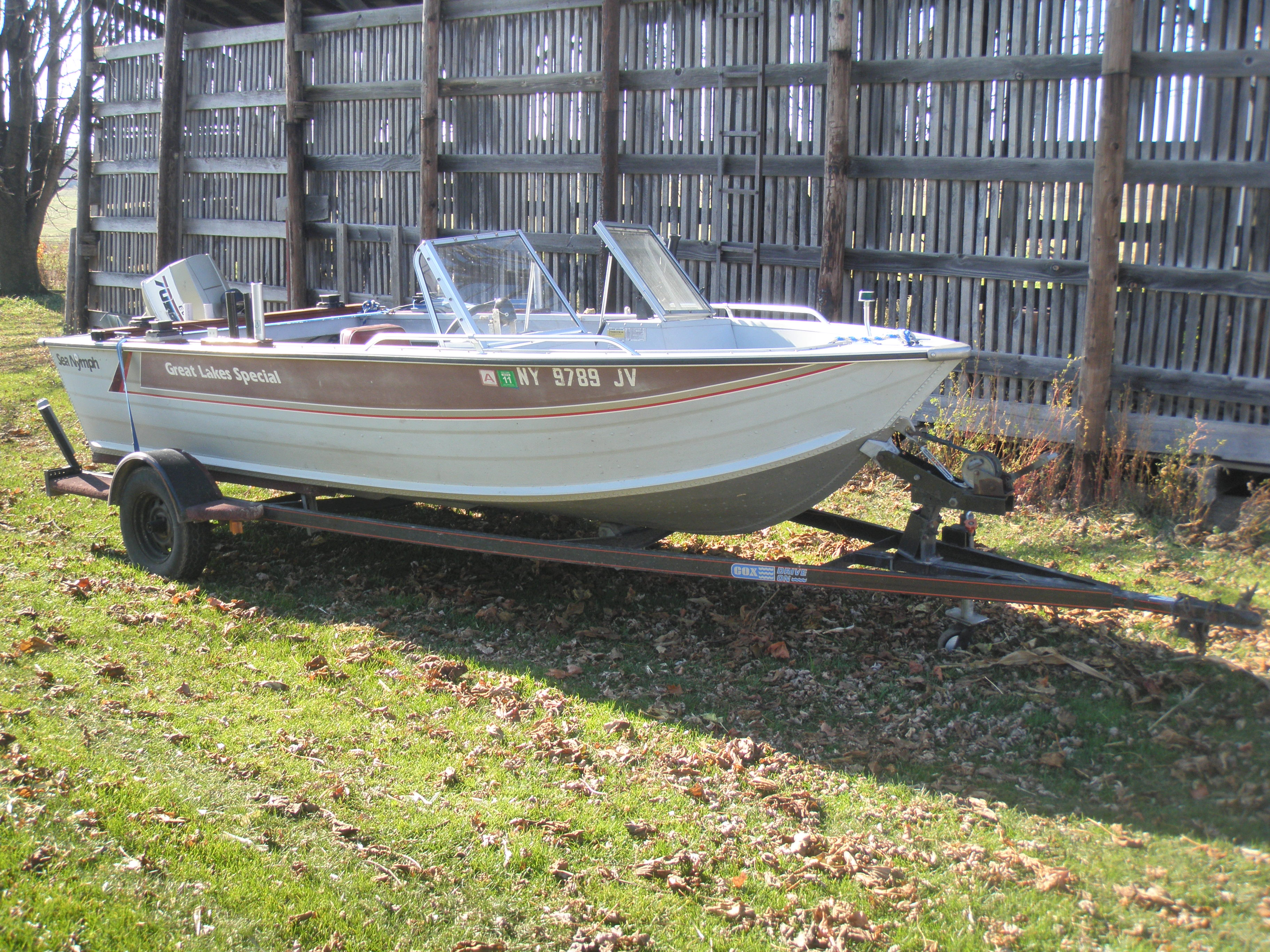
Lowe Boats Sea Nymph recreational fishing boat on a boat trailer

Both stock trailers and horse trailers range in size from small units capable of holding one to three animals, able to be pulled by a pickup truck, SUV or even a quad bike; to large semi-trailers that can haul a significant number of animals.

=== Roll trailer ===
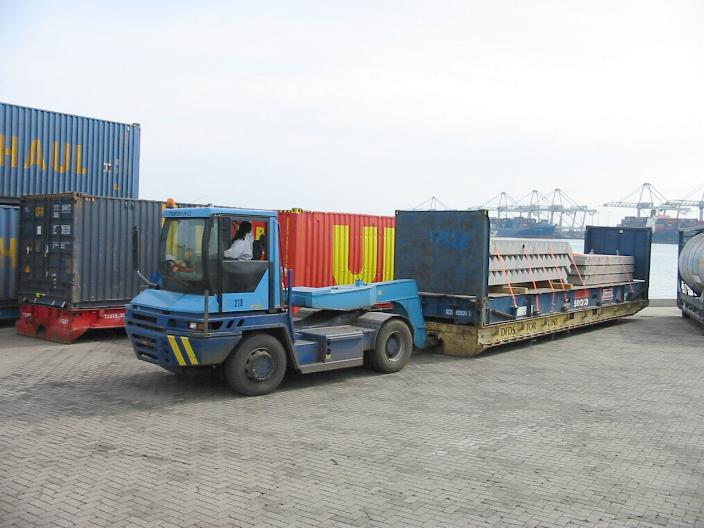
Maritime shipping Mafi Roll trailer

=== Baggage trailer ===
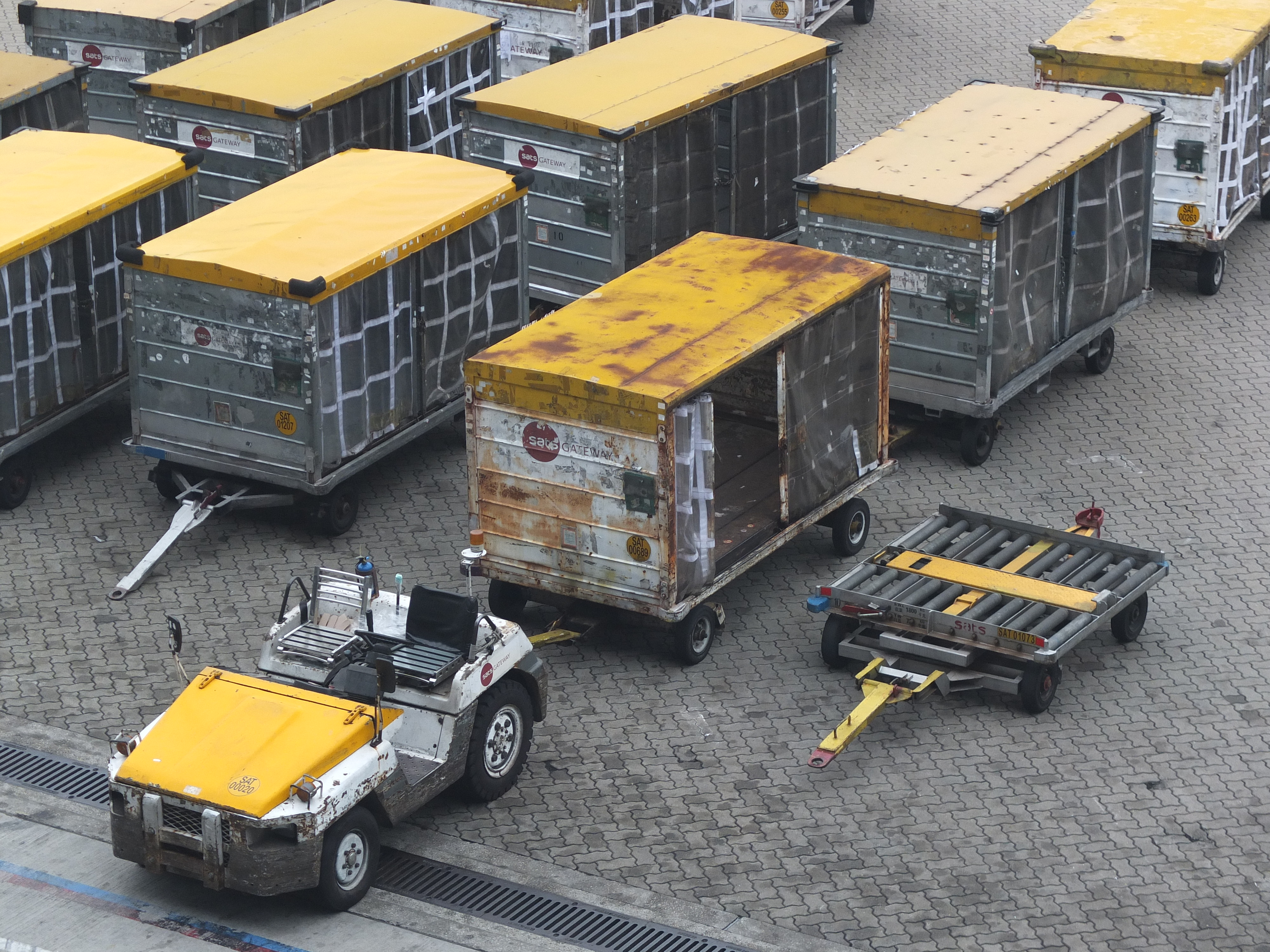
A single trailer for an aircraft cargo unit load device, next to a group of trailers for loose luggage

Baggage trailers are used for the transportation of loose baggage, oversized bags, mail bags, loose cargo carton boxes, etc. between the aircraft and the terminal or sorting facility. Dollies for loose baggage are fitted with a brake system which blocks the wheels from moving when the connecting rod is not attached to a tug. Most dollies for loose baggage are completely enclosed except for the sides which use plastic curtains to protect items from weather. In the US, these dollies are called baggage carts, but in Europe baggage cart means passenger baggage trolleys.

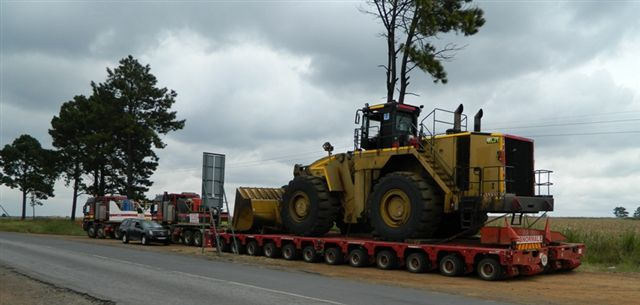
Mammoet Tii Hydraulic modular trailer attached to a Mercedes ballast tractor moving front end loader

=== Hydraulic modular trailer ===
A hydraulic modular trailer (HMT) is a special platform trailer unit which feature swing axles, hydraulic suspension, independently steerable axles, two or more axle rows, compatible to join two or more units longitudinally and laterally and uses power pack unit (PPU) to steer and adjust height. These trailer units are used to transport oversized load, which are difficult to disassemble and are overweight. These trailers are manufactured using high tensile steel, which makes it possible to bear the weight of the load with the help of one or more ballast tractors which push and pull these units via drawbar or gooseneck together making a heavy hauler unit.

Typical loads include oil rig modules, bridge sections, buildings, ship sections, and industrial machinery such as generators and turbines. There is a limited number of manufacturers who produce these heavy-duty trailers because the market share of oversized loads is very thin when we talk about the transportation industry. There are self-powered units of hydraulic modular trailers, which are called SPMT which are used when the ballast tractors can not be applied.

=== Passenger trailer ===
A passenger trailer is for transporting passengers hauled by a tractor unit similar to that of a truck. These trailers have become obsolete due to the issue of the communication between the driver and the conductor and traffic jams.

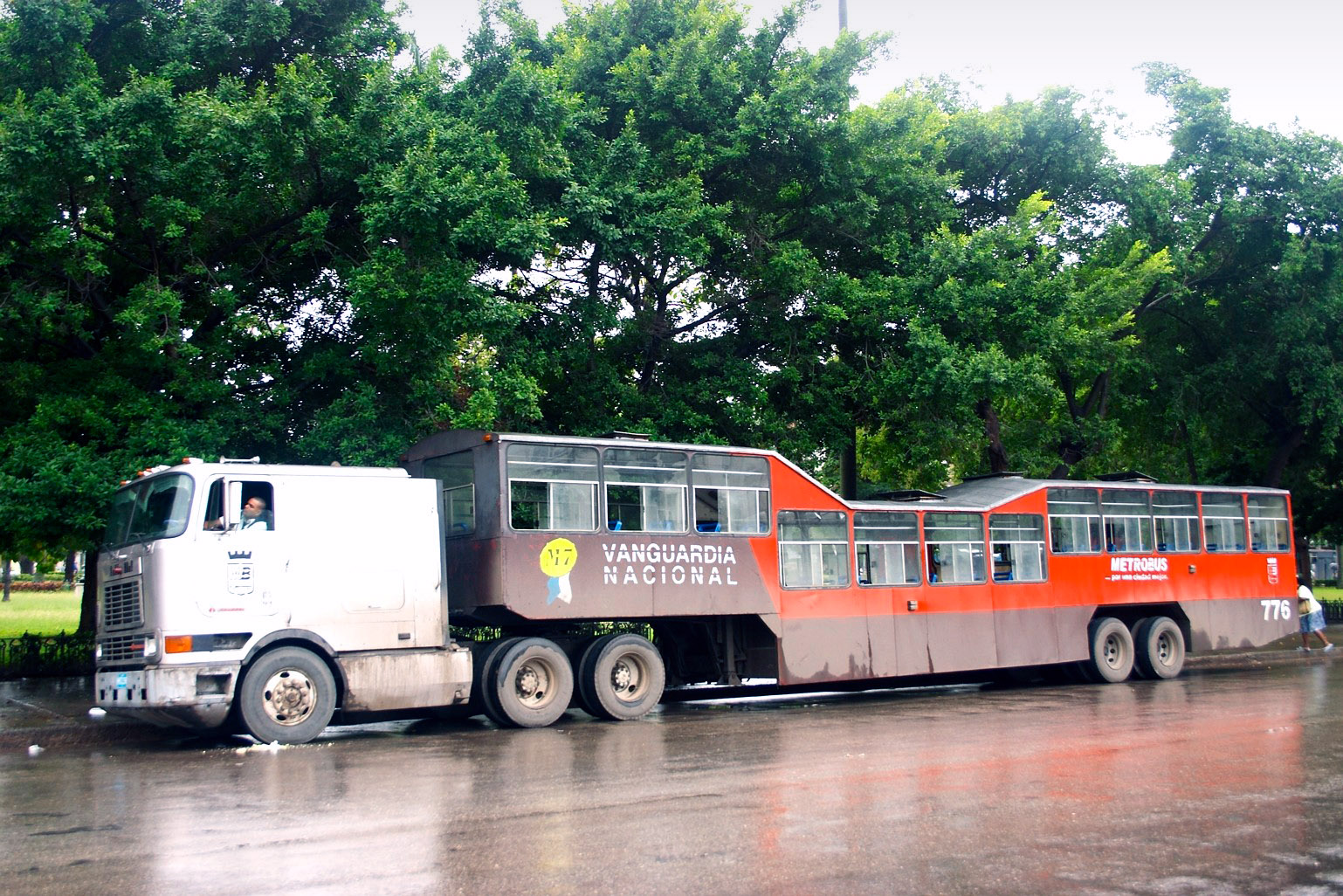
Camel bus in Havana

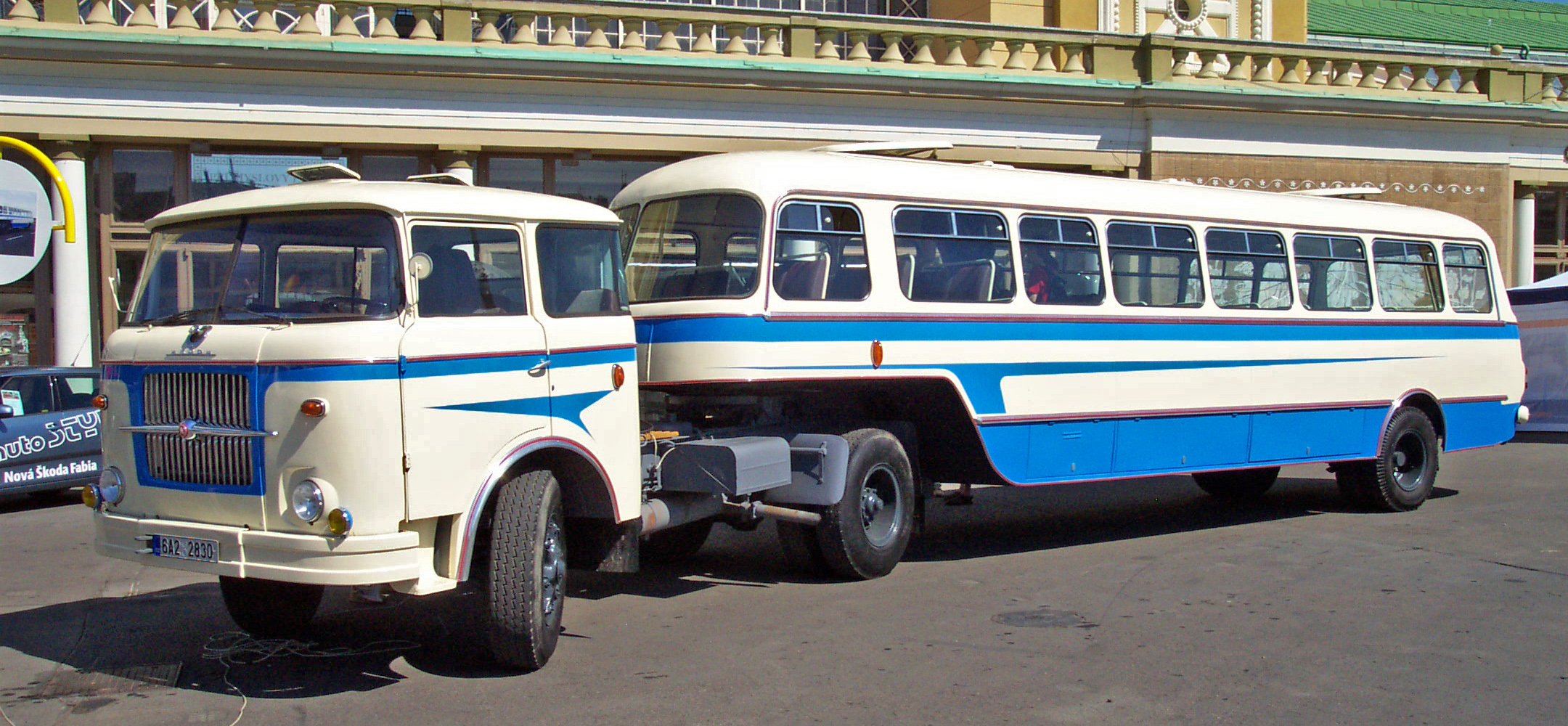
Karosa NO 80 trailer bus

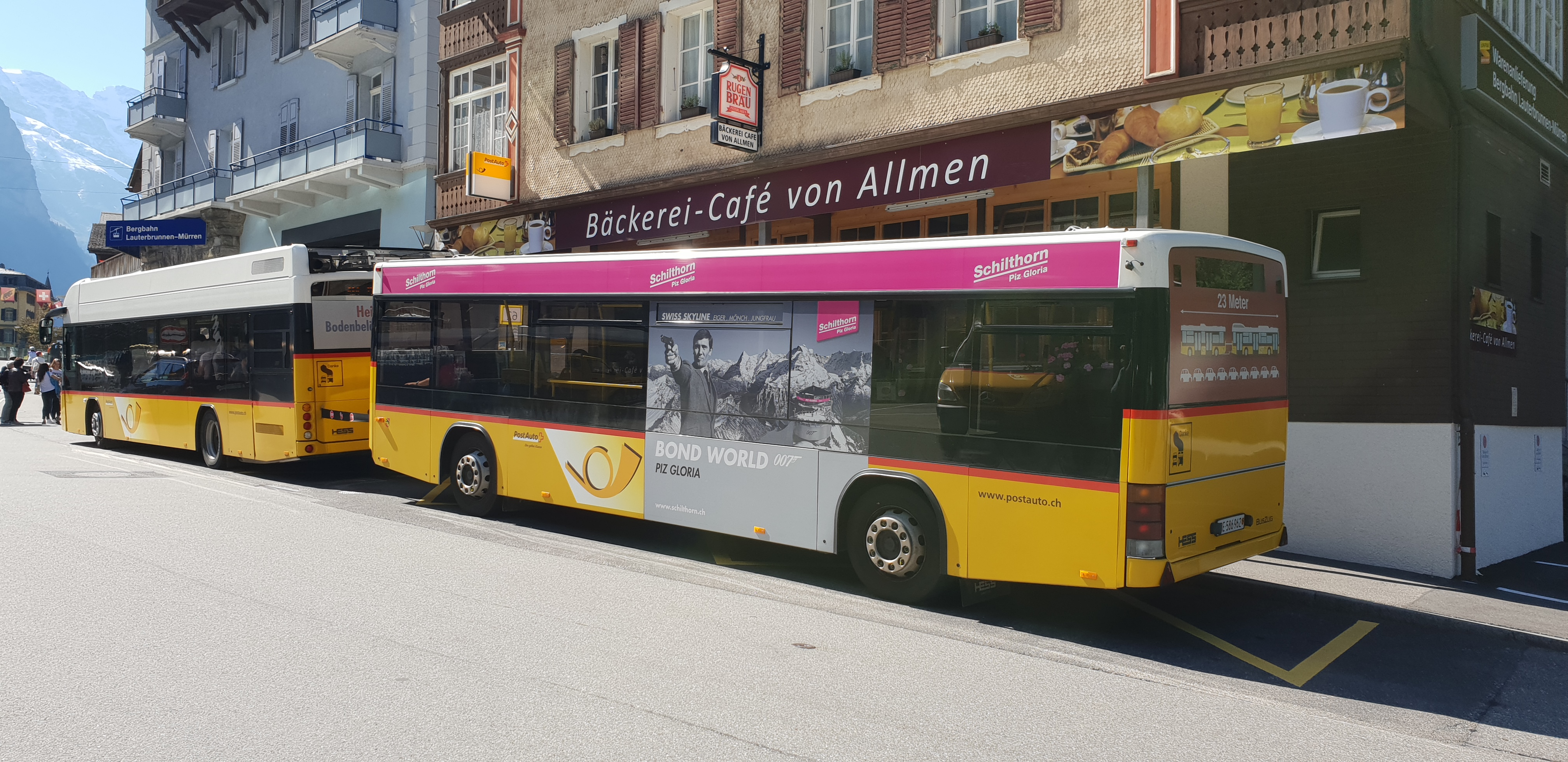
Bus trailer in Lauterbrunnen

== Hitching ==
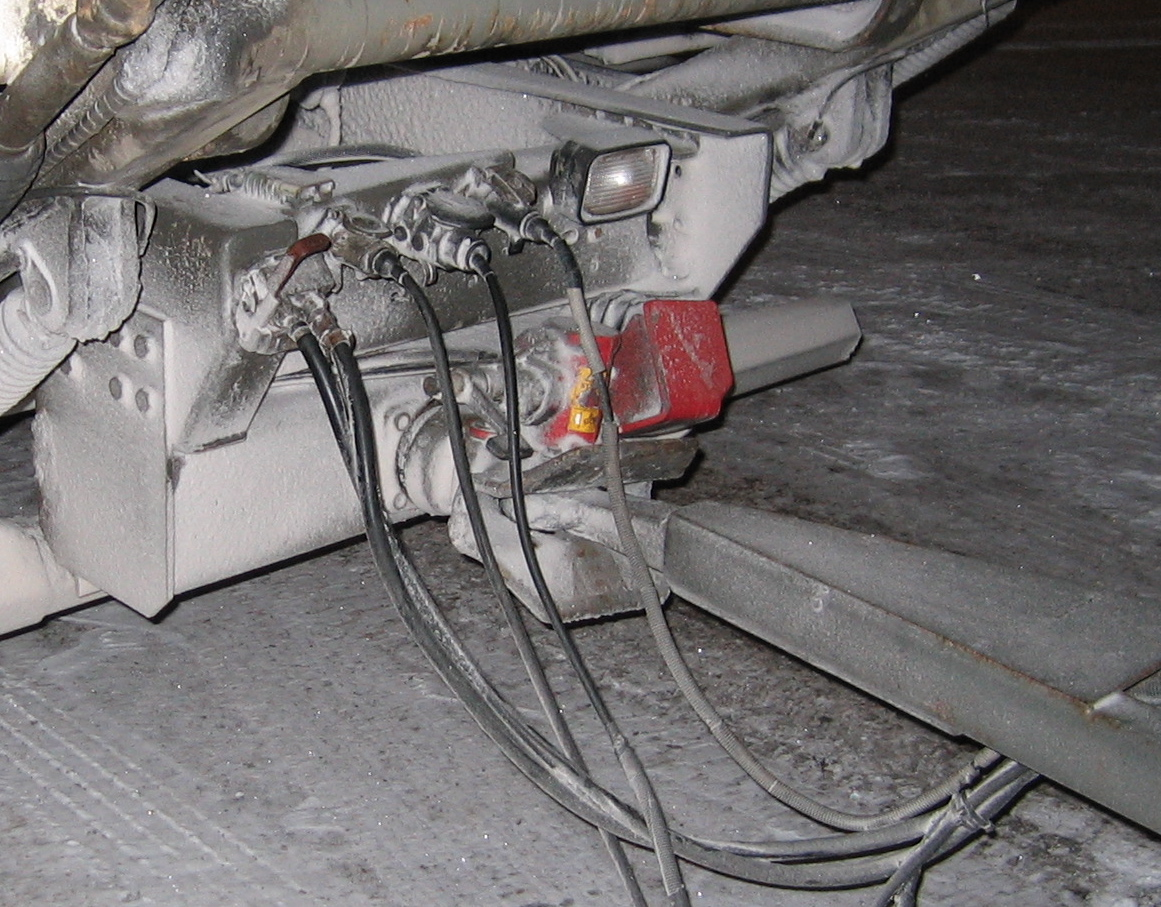
Trailer hitch on a large vehicle

A trailer hitch, fifth-wheel coupling or other type of tow hitch is needed to draw a trailer with a car, truck or other traction engine.

=== Ball and socket ===
A trailer coupler is used to secure the trailer to the towing vehicle. The trailer coupler attaches to the trailer ball. This forms a ball and socket connection to allow for relative movement between the towing vehicle and trailer while towing over uneven road surfaces. The trailer ball is mounted to the rear bumper or to a draw bar, which may be removable. The draw bar is secured to the trailer hitch by inserting it into the hitch receiver and pinning it. The three most common types of couplers are straight couplers, A-frame couplers, and adjustable couplers. Bumper-pull hitches and draw bars can exert tremendous leverage on the tow vehicle making it harder to recover from a swerving situation.

=== Fifth wheel and gooseneck ===
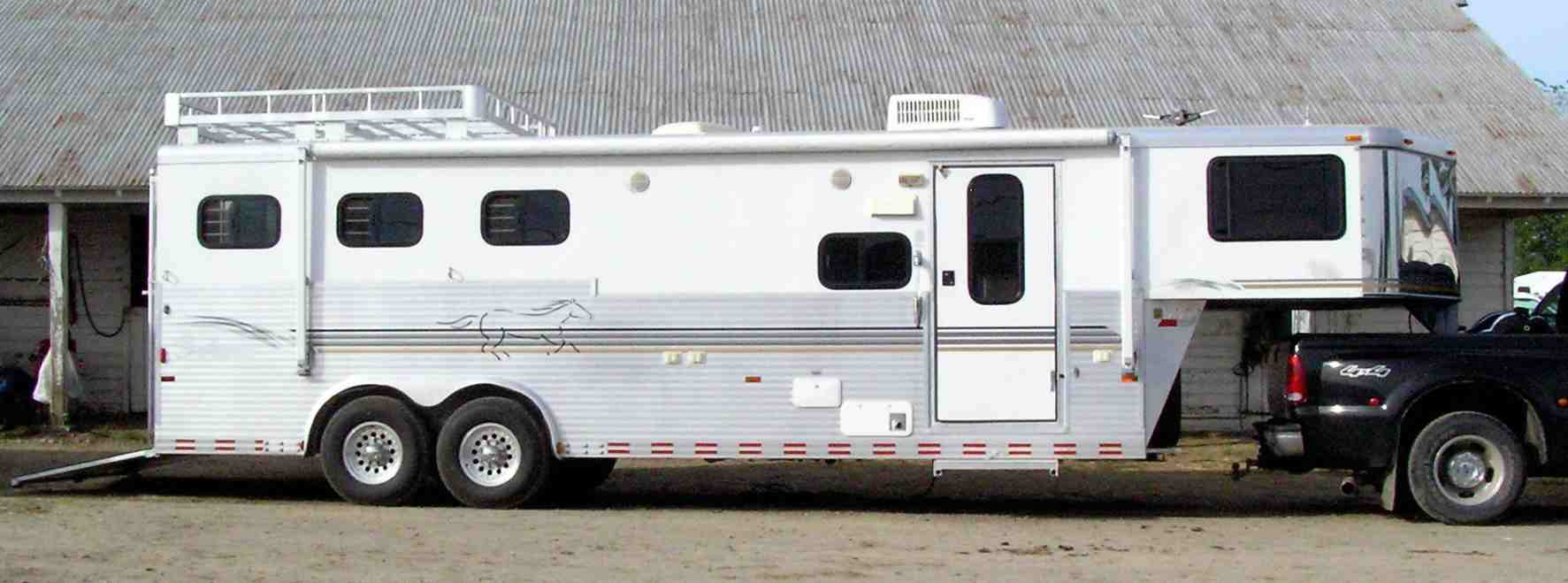
A gooseneck trailer attached to a pickup truck

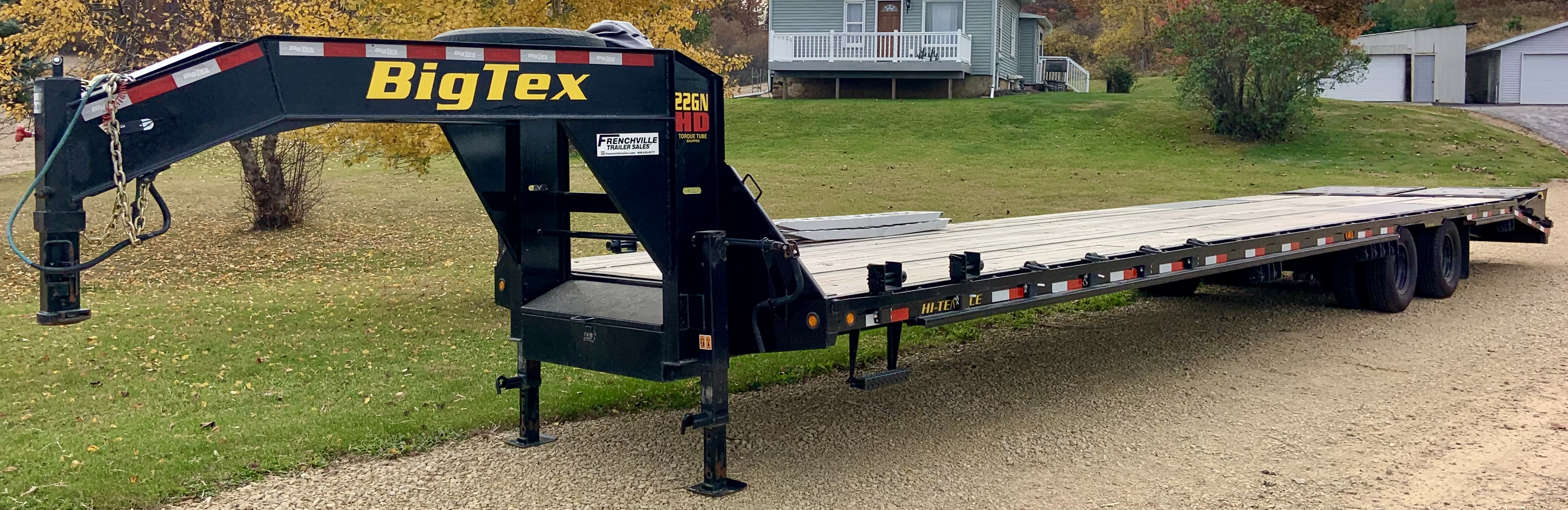
Gooseneck trailer

These are available for loads between 10,000 and 30,000 pounds (4.5–13.6 t; 5.0–15.0 short tons; 4.5–13.4 long tons). Both the hitches are better than a receiver hitch and allow a more efficient and central attachment of a large trailer to the tow vehicle. They can haul large loads without disrupting the stability of the vehicle. Traditional hitches are connected to the rear of the vehicle at the frame or bumper, while fifth wheel and gooseneck trailers are attached to the truck bed above the rear axle. This coupling location allows the truck to make sharper turns and haul heavier trailers. They can be mounted in the bed of a pickup truck or any type of flatbed. A fifth-wheel coupling is also referred to as a kingpin hitch and is a smaller version of the semi-trailer "fifth wheel". Though a fifth wheel and a gooseneck trailer look much the same, their method for coupling is different. A fifth wheel uses a large horseshoe-shaped coupling device mounted 1 foot (0.30 m) or more above the bed of the tow vehicle. A gooseneck couples to a standard 2 5/16-inch (59 mm) ball mounted on the bed of the tow vehicle. The operational difference between the two is the range of movement in the hitch. The gooseneck is very maneuverable and can tilt in all directions, while the fifth wheel is intended for level roads and limited tilt side to side. Gooseneck mounts are often used for agricultural and industrial trailers. Fifth-wheel mounts are often used for recreational trailers. Standard bumper-hitch trailers typically allow a 10% or 15% hitch load while a fifth wheel and gooseneck can handle 20% or 25% weight transfer.

== Jacks ==
The basic function of a trailer jack is to lift the trailer to a height that allows the trailer to be hitched or unhitched to and from the towing vehicle. Trailer jacks are also used for leveling the trailer during storage. The most common types of trailer jacks are A-frame jacks, swivel jacks, and drop-leg jacks. Some trailers, such as horse trailers, have a built-in jack at the tongue for this purpose.

== Electrical components ==
Many older cars took the feeds for the trailer's lights directly from the towing vehicle's rear light circuits. As bulb-check systems were introduced in the 1990s "by-pass relays" were introduced. These took a small signal from the rear lights to switch a relay which in turn powered the trailer's lights with its own power feed. Many towing electrical installations, including vehicle-specific kits incorporate some form of bypass relays.

In the US, trailer lights usually have a shared light for brake and turn indicators. If such a trailer is to be connected to a car with separate lamps for turn indicator and brake a trailer light converter is needed, which allows for attaching the trailer's lights to the wiring of the vehicle.

Nowadays some vehicles are being fitted with CANbus networks, and some of these use the CANbus to connect the tow bar electrics to various safety systems and controls. For vehicles that use the CANbus to activate towing-related safety systems, a wiring kit that can interact appropriately must be used. Without such a towbar wiring kit the vehicle cannot detect the presence of a trailer and can therefore not activate safety features such as trailer stability program which can electronically control a snaking trailer or caravan.

By-pass systems are cheap, but may not be appropriate on cars with interactive safety features.

=== Brakes ===
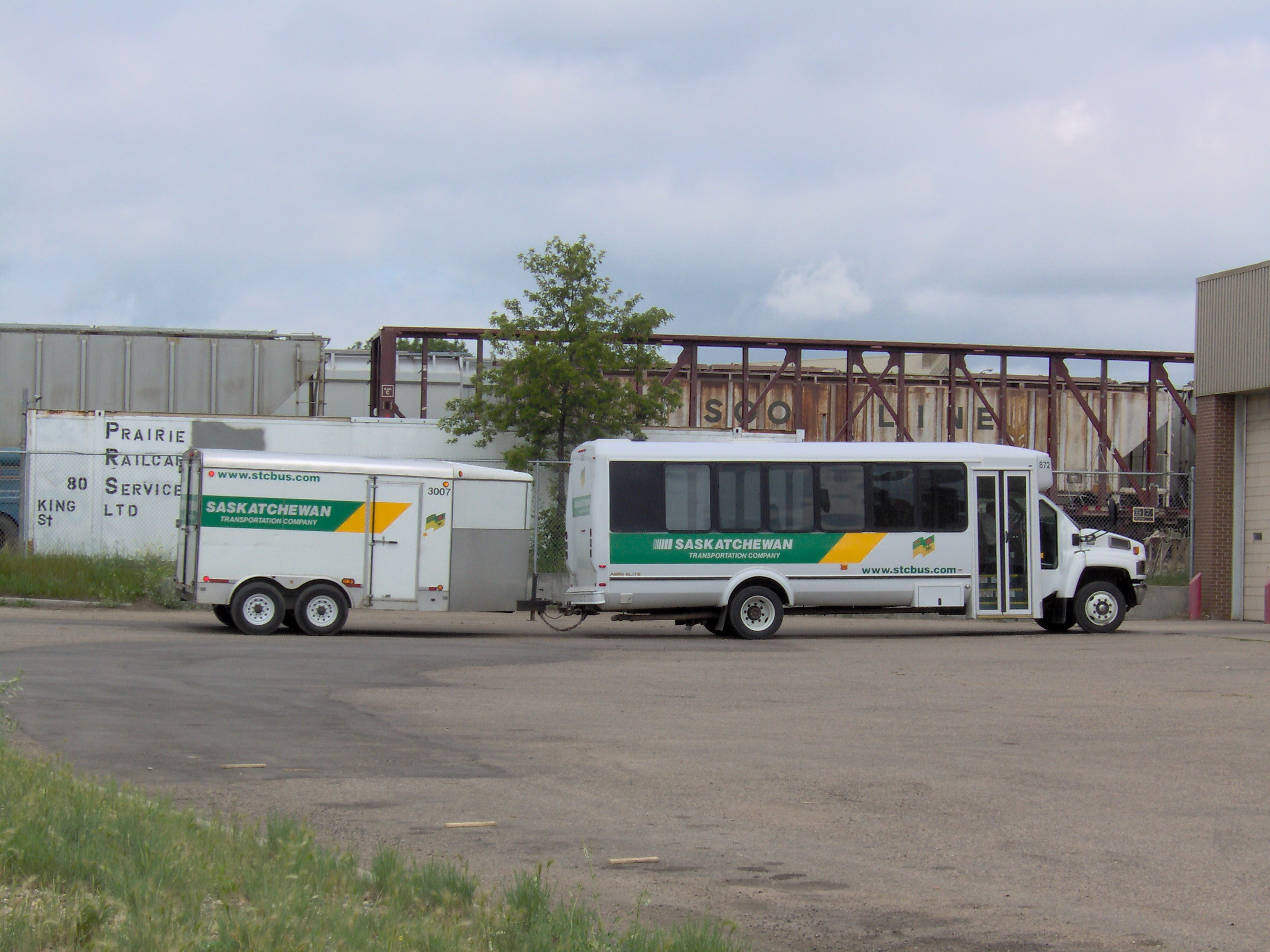
Bus and trailer in Saskatchewan, Canada

Larger trailers are usually fitted with brakes. These can be either electrically operated, air operated, or overrun brakes.

== Stability ==
Trailer stability can be defined as the tendency of a trailer to dissipate side-to-side motion. The initial motion may be caused by aerodynamic forces, such as from a crosswind or a passing vehicle. One common criterion for stability is the center of mass location with respect to the wheels, which can usually be detected by tongue weight. If the center of mass of the trailer is behind its wheels, therefore having a negative tongue weight, the trailer will likely be unstable. Another parameter which is less commonly a factor is the trailer moment of inertia. Even if the center of mass is forward of the wheels, a trailer with a long load, and thus a large moment of inertia, may be unstable.

Some vehicles are equipped with a Trailer Stability Program that may compensate for improper loading.

== See also ==
- Electric vehicle battery
- Towing
- Tractor unit
- Trailer brake controller
- Trailer bus
- Vehicle category
- Walking floor

=== List of types of trailers ===
- Bicycle trailer
- Boat trailer
- Bus trailer
- Compressed hydrogen tube trailer
- Construction trailer
- Dolly
- Dump trailer
- Enclosed cargo trailer
- Flat deck trailer
- Frac Tank
- Forestry trailer
- Genset trailer
- Horse trailer
- Hydraulic modular trailer
- Jeep trailer
- Liquid hydrogen trailer
- Lowboy (trailer)
- Mafi roll trailer
- Mobile home
- Motorcycle trailer
- Popup camper
- Pusher trailer
- Roll trailer
- Semi-trailer
- Solar trailer (for solar vehicles)
- Tautliner
- Tank trailer
- Travel trailer
- Food truck
- Mobile catering
