= Gooseneck =

Gooseneck may refer to:

== Biology ==
- The neck of a goose
- Gooseneck barnacle, a species of crustacean
- A flower of the variety Lysimachia clethroides

== Geography ==
- Gooseneck, Isle of Man, a hairpin corner on the Snaefell Mountain Course
- A type of erosional feature, in which a meander of an entrenched river gets entrenched into surrounding bedrock, as in Goosenecks State Park

== Mechanical ==
- Gooseneck (sailing), a type of sailing rigging attachment
- Gooseneck (drilling rig), a thick, hollow metal elbow that supports and provides a downward angle from which the Kelly hose hangs
- Gooseneck (piping), a piping or ductwork feature
- A crowbar (tool)
- A gooseneck flask (or swan neck flask) is a flask used in biology that has a curved neck to trap particulate
- A gooseneck trailer hitch, for commercial and agricultural use
- Gooseneck (fixture), a type of flexible tubing used in gooseneck lamps or microphone stands
- A kind of a chopper motorcycle frame, which has the front part of frame (between the fuel tank and the fork) stretched

== See also ==
- William Madison McDonald (1866–1950), American politician, businessman and banker nicknamed "Gooseneck Bill"
