= Fuel cell auxiliary power unit =

A fuel cell auxiliary power unit (FC-APU) is a fuel cell based auxiliary power unit on a vehicle that provides energy for functions other than propulsion. They are mainly used in trucking, aviation, marine and recreational vehicles.

== Market ==
In 2010 there were globally 3,100 fuel cell APU shipments.

== Trucks ==
Around 300,000 refrigerator trucks with auxiliary power units are on the road in the United States, according to a 2013 estimate. In recent years, truck and fuel cell manufacturers have teamed up to create, test and demonstrate a fuel cell APU that eliminates nearly all emissions and uses diesel fuel more efficiently.

In 2008, a DOE sponsored partnership between Delphi Electronics and Peterbilt demonstrated that a fuel cell could provide power to the electronics and air conditioning of a Peterbilt Model 386 under simulated "idling" conditions for 10 hours. This solid oxide fuel cell can directly accept diesel using an integrated endothermic reformer. Delphi has said the 5 kW system for Class 8 trucks will be released in 2012, at an $8000–9000 price tag that would be competitive with other "midrange" two-cylinder diesel APUs, should they be able to meet those deadlines and cost estimates. In 2013, DOE announced a similar project giving grants to Nuvera and Plug Power Inc., though this project is based on hydrogen-powered fuel cells.

== Research ==
- RDSO started a project to develop fuel cell assisted Auxiliary power units in diesel-electric locomotives of Indian Railways.
- PowerCell is testing an autothermal reformer and a PEM fuel cell stack to convert diesel fuel into electricity for trucks.

== See also ==
- Refrigerator car
- Refrigerated container
- Trailer refrigeration unit
