= Refrigerator truck =

Vehicle for low-temperature freight

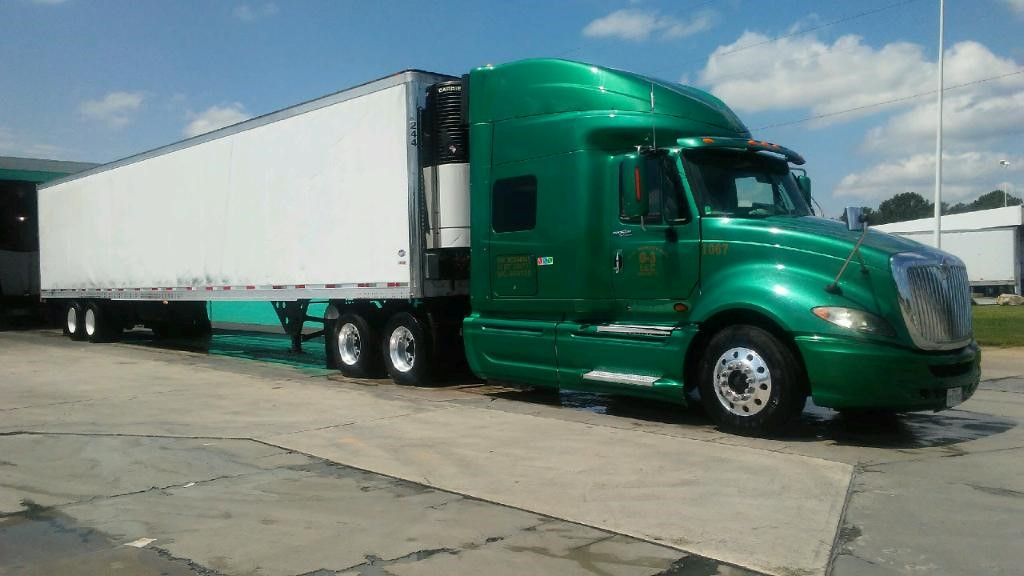
G-3 Resources LLC Truck

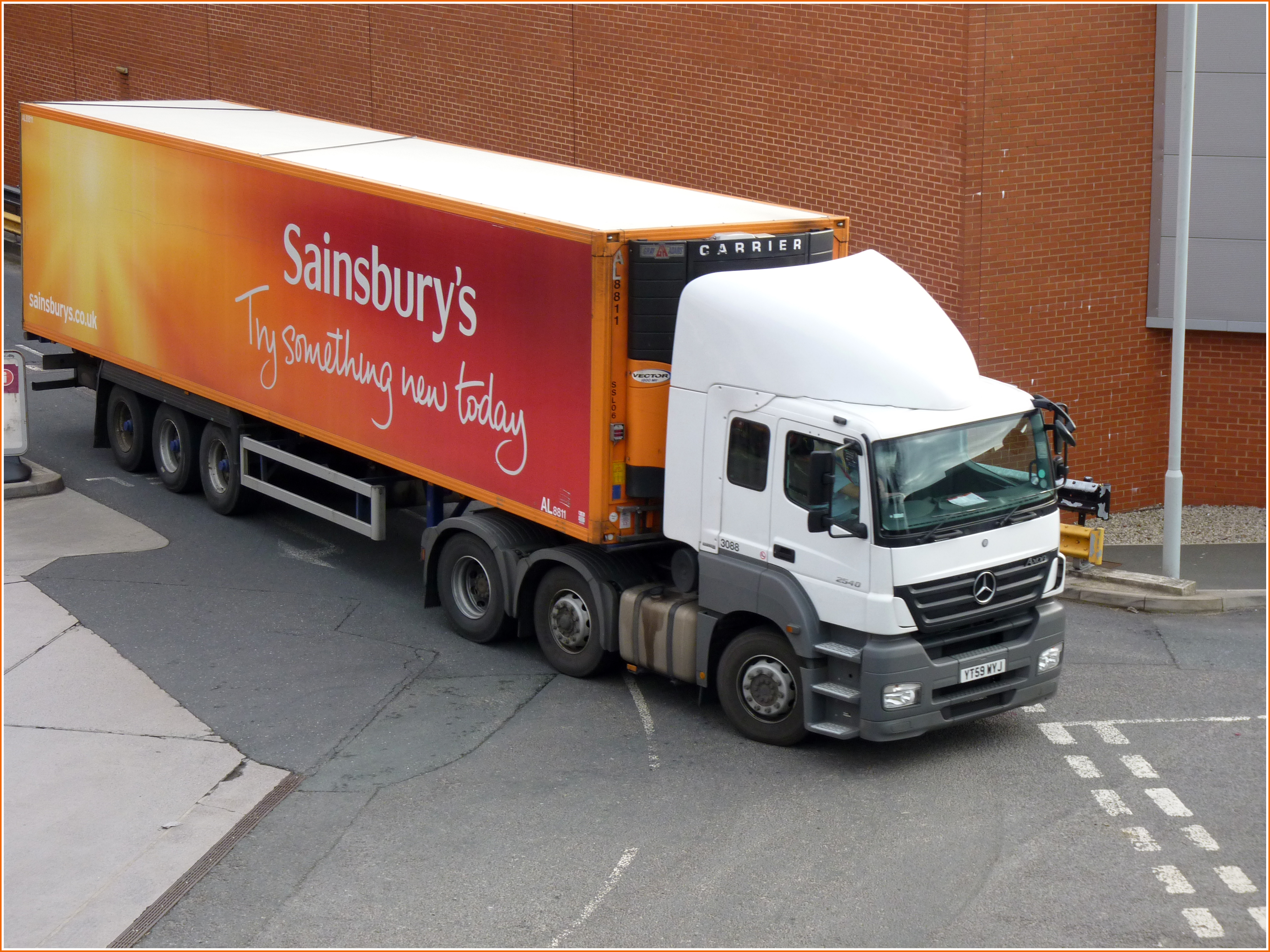
Articulated lorry with refrigerated trailer made by Gray & Adams

A refrigerator truck or chiller lorry (also called a reefer), is a van or truck designed to carry perishable freight at low temperatures. Most long-distance refrigerated transport by truck is done in articulated trucks pulling refrigerated hardside (box) semi-trailers, although insulated curtainsiders are common in some countries. Occasionally, refrigerated trailers have been used as temporary morgues, and second-hand refrigerated trailers are frequently sold for use in tiny home conversions due to their insulation and existing status as a vehicle.

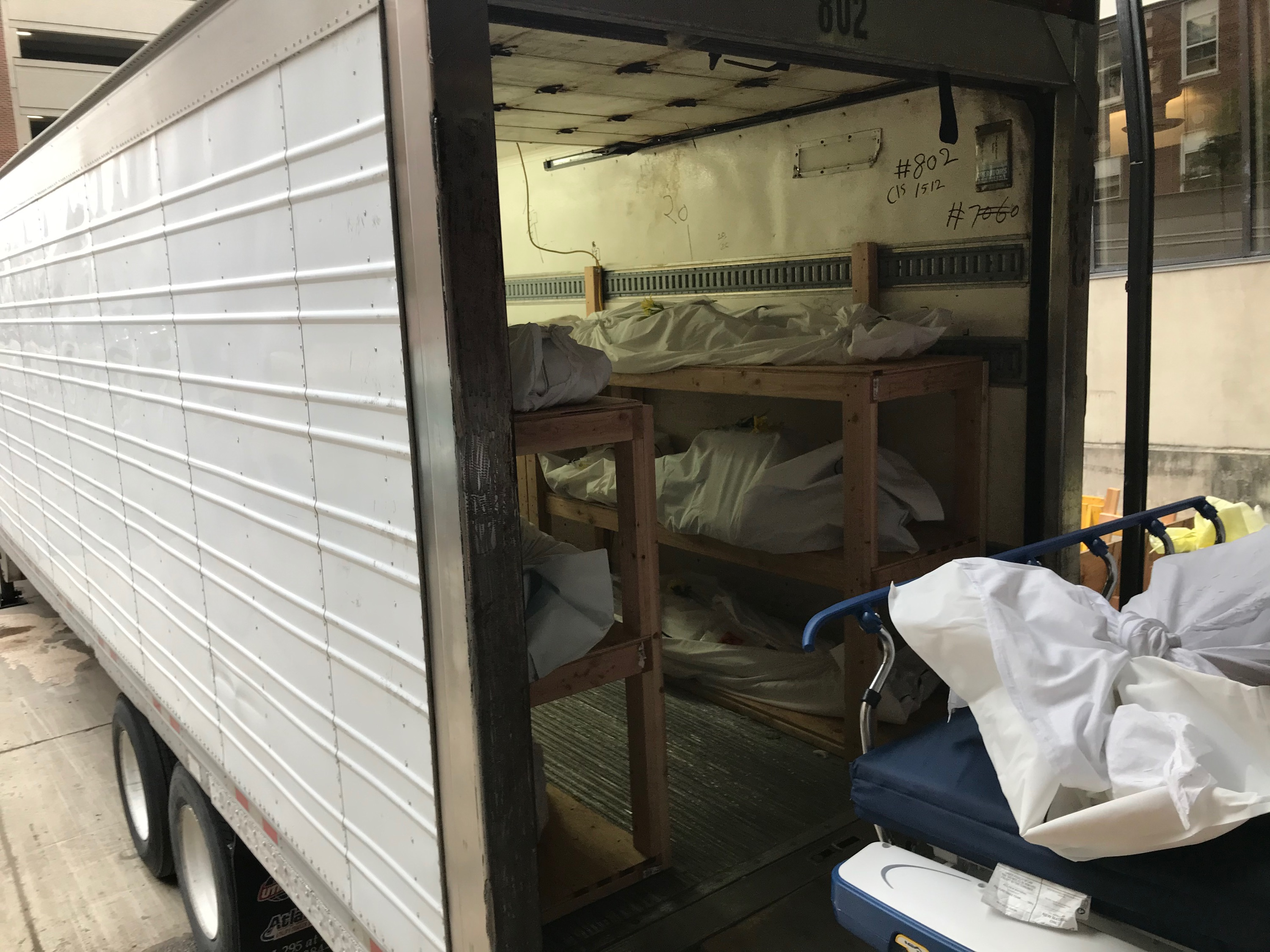
The deceased being loaded into a trailer

== History ==
The first successful mechanically refrigerated trucks were made for the ice cream industry in 1925. By the early 1930s different types of mechanical refrigeration were designed for the transportation of dairy, meat, fish and other such products. In 1938 Frederick McKinley Jones invented an improved type of mechanical refrigeration system which became widely successful commercially.

There were around 4 million refrigerated road vehicles in use in 2010 worldwide.

== Features ==
Like refrigerator cars, refrigerated trucks differ from simple insulated and ventilated vans (commonly used for transporting fruit), neither of which are fitted with cooling apparatus.

Refrigerator trucks can be cooled with ice, dry ice, liquid carbon dioxide, or mechanical refrigeration systems (transport refrigeration units, TRUs) powered by small displacement engines or by the truck's main engine.

They are often equipped with small "vent doors" at the rear and front of the trailer. These doors are kept open while hauling non-refrigerated cargo (often "backhaul") to air out the trailer.

== See also ==
- Cold chain
- Fuel cell auxiliary power unit
- Reefer (container)
- Reefer ship
- Refrigerated van
- Refrigerator car
- Temperature data logger

== Bibliography ==
- Prentice, B. E., & Benell, D. (1992). "Determinants of empty returns by US refrigerated trucks: conjoint analysis approach". Canadian Journal of Agricultural Economics/Revue canadienne d'agroeconomie, 40(1), 109-127. doi:10.1111/j.1744-7976.1992.tb03680.x (abstract).
