= Gray & Adams =

Trailer, 2021

Gray & Adams is a British company based in Fraserburgh, Scotland that manufactures refrigerated trailers.

Yard outside Fraserburgh, 2006

It was founded by Jim Gray in 1957 as a repair shop, which Jim Adams joined in 1960; as of 2022 it employed around 750 people and was owned by the Gray family.
