= Tautliner =

Curtain-sided trucks

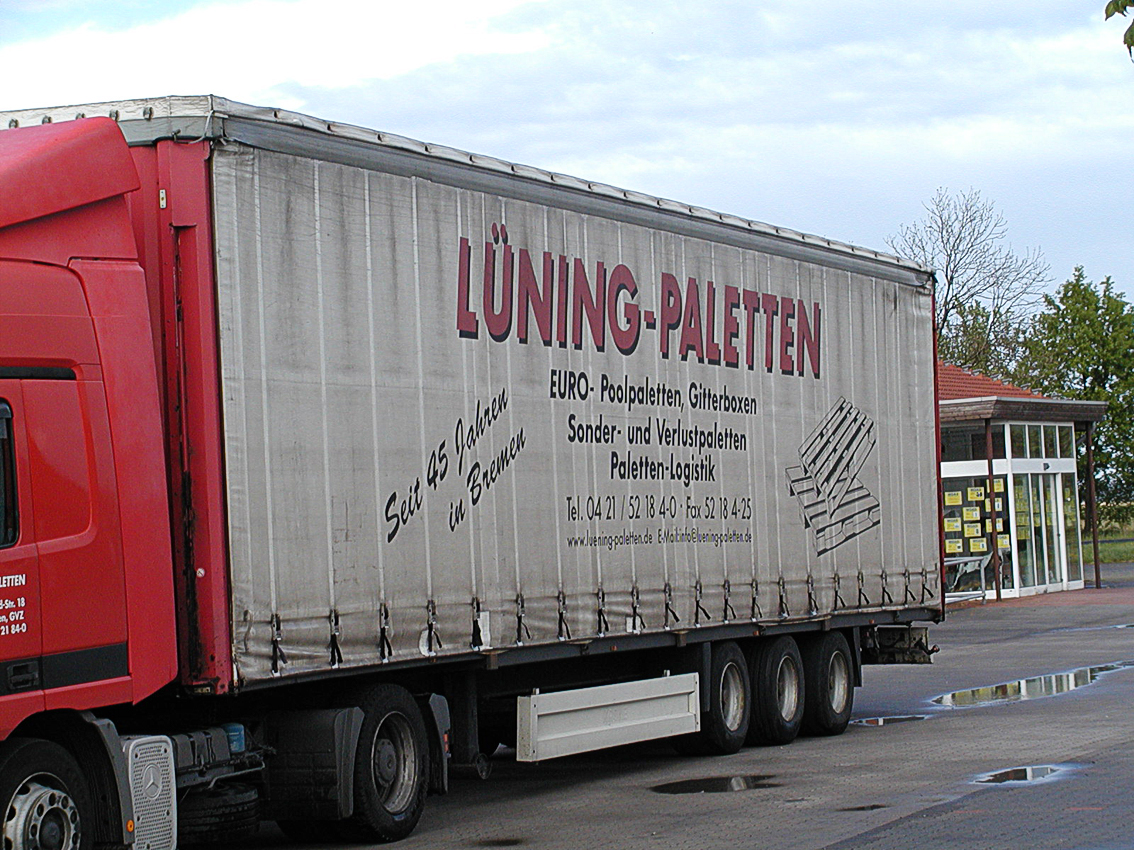
A tautliner semi-trailer

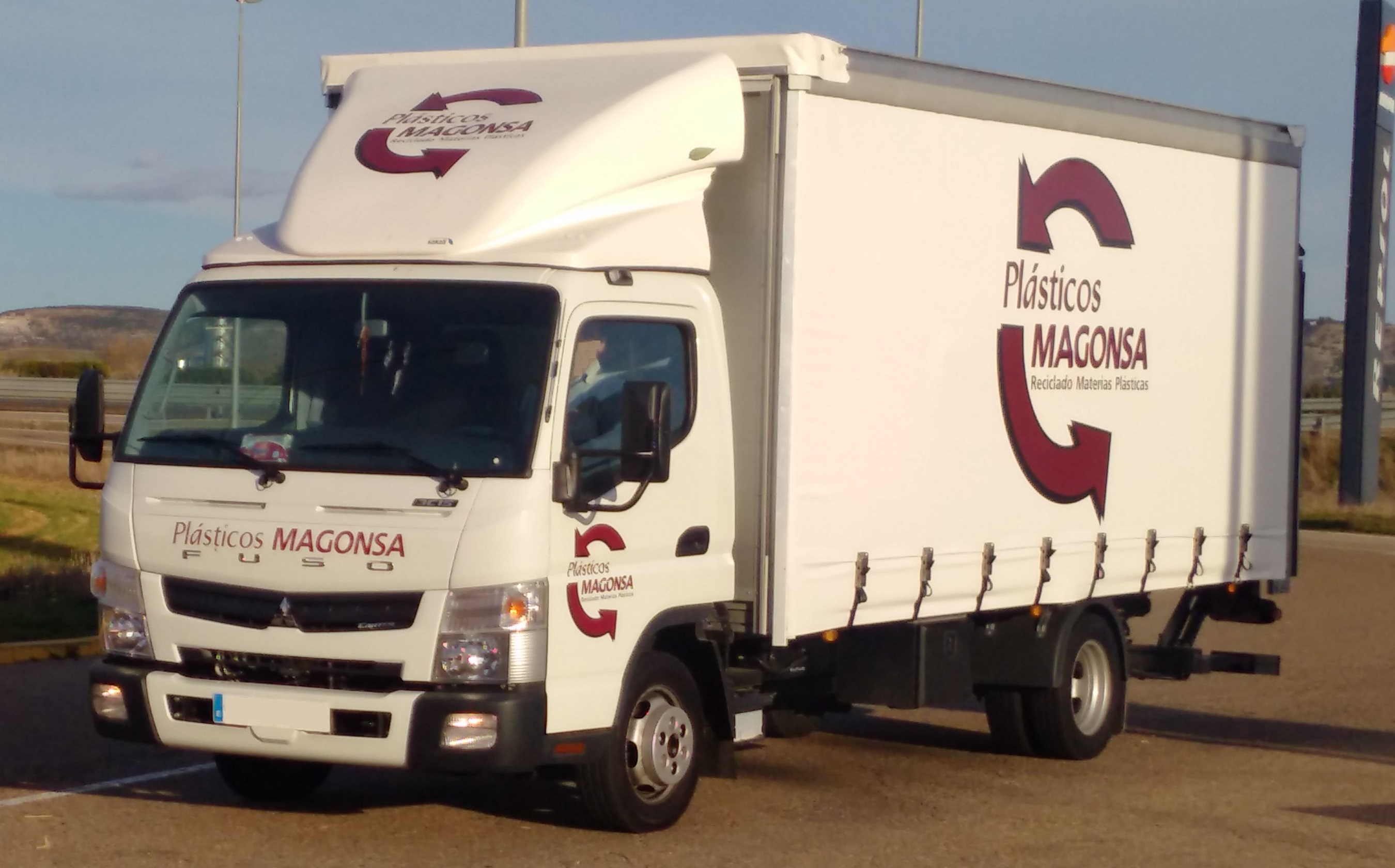
A tautliner medium truck.

Tautliner and curtainsider are used as generic names for curtain sided trucks/trailers. Tautliner is the trade name of commercial vehicles built by Boalloy of Congleton, Cheshire, England. The curtains are permanently fixed to a runner at the top and detachable rails/poles at front and rear, allowing the curtains to be drawn open and forklifts used all along the sides for easy and efficient loading and unloading. When closed for travel, vertical load restraint straps are attached to a rope rail beneath the truck bed, connecting the truck bed and curtain along both sides. Winches at either end of the curtain tension it, hence the 'Tautliner' name. This stops the curtain from flapping or drumming in the wind and can also help retain light loads from slipping sideways.

Curtains can be rated to restrain a load of a defined weight per metre but only if the load is positioned within a certain distance from the curtain.

The company patented the concept in 1969, and credits much of its popularity to its adoption by the haulier Eddie Stobart.

== See also ==
- Flatbed truck, the standard general haulage truck before Tautliners
