= List of ARM Cortex-M development tools =

This is a list of development tools for 32-bit ARM Cortex-M-based microcontrollers, which consists of Cortex-M0, Cortex-M0+, Cortex-M1, Cortex-M3, Cortex-M4, Cortex-M7, Cortex-M23, Cortex-M33, Cortex-M35P, Cortex-M52, Cortex-M55, and Cortex-M85 cores.

== Development toolchains ==
IDE, compiler, linker, debugger, flashing (in alphabetical order):

- Ac6 System Workbench for STM32 (Note: Only for STM32 microcontrollers.) (based on Eclipse and the GNU GCC toolchain with direct support for all ST-provided evaluation boards, Eval, Discovery and Nucleo, debug with ST-LINK)
- ARM Development Studio 5 by ARM Ltd.
- Atmel Studio (Note: Only for Atmel processors.) by Atmel (based on Visual Studio and GNU GCC Toolchain)
- Code Composer Studio (Note: Only for Texas Instruments processors.) by Texas Instruments
- CoIDE by CooCox (note - website dead since 2018)
- Crossware Development Suite for ARM by Crossware
- CrossWorks for ARM by Rowley
- Dave by Infineon. For XMC processors only. Includes project wizard, detailed register decoding and a code library still under development.
- DRT by SOMNIUM Technologies. Based on GCC toolchain and proprietary linker technology. Available as a plugin for Atmel Studio and an Eclipse-based IDE.
- EmBitz (formerly Em::Blocks) – free, fast (non-eclipse) IDE for ST-LINK (live data updates), OpenOCD, including GNU Tools for ARM and project wizards for ST, Atmel, EnergyMicro etc.
- Embeetle IDE - free, fast (non-eclipse) IDE. Works both on Linux and Windows.
- emIDE by emide – free Visual Studio Style IDE including GNU Tools for ARM
- GNU ARM Eclipse – A family of Eclipse CDT extensions and tools for GNU ARM development
- GNU Tools (aka GCC) for ARM Embedded Processors by ARM Ltd – free GCC for bare metal
- IAR Embedded Workbench for ARM by IAR Systems
- ICC by ImageCraft
- Keil MDK-ARM by Keil
- LPCXpresso (Note: Only for NXP processors.) by NXP (formerly Red Suite by Code Red Technologies)
- MikroC by mikroe – mikroC
- MULTI by Green Hills Software, for all Arm 7, 9, Cortex-M, Cortex-R, Cortex-A
- Ride and RKit for ARM by Raisonance
- SEGGER Embedded Studio for ARM by Segger.
- SEGGER Ozone by Segger.
- STM32CubeIDE by STMicroelectronics - Combines STCubeMX with TrueSTUDIO into a single Eclipse style package
- Sourcery CodeBench by Mentor Graphics
- TASKING VX-Toolset by Altium
- TrueSTUDIO by Atollic
- Visual Studio by Microsoft as IDE, with GNU Tools as compiler/linker – e.g. supported by VisualGDB
- VXM Design's Buildroot toolchain for Cortex. It integrates GNU toolchain, Nuttx, filesystem and debugger/flasher in one build.
- winIDEA/winIDEAOpen by iSYSTEM
- YAGARTO – free GCC (no longer supported)
- Code::Blocks (EPS edition) (debug with ST-LINK no GDB and no OpenOCD required)

IDE for Arduino ARM boards

- Arduino (Note: Support "out of the box" only for compatible processors.) – IDE for Atmel SAM3X (Arduino Due)
- Energia – Arduino IDE for Texas Instruments Tiva and CC3200

== Debugging tools ==
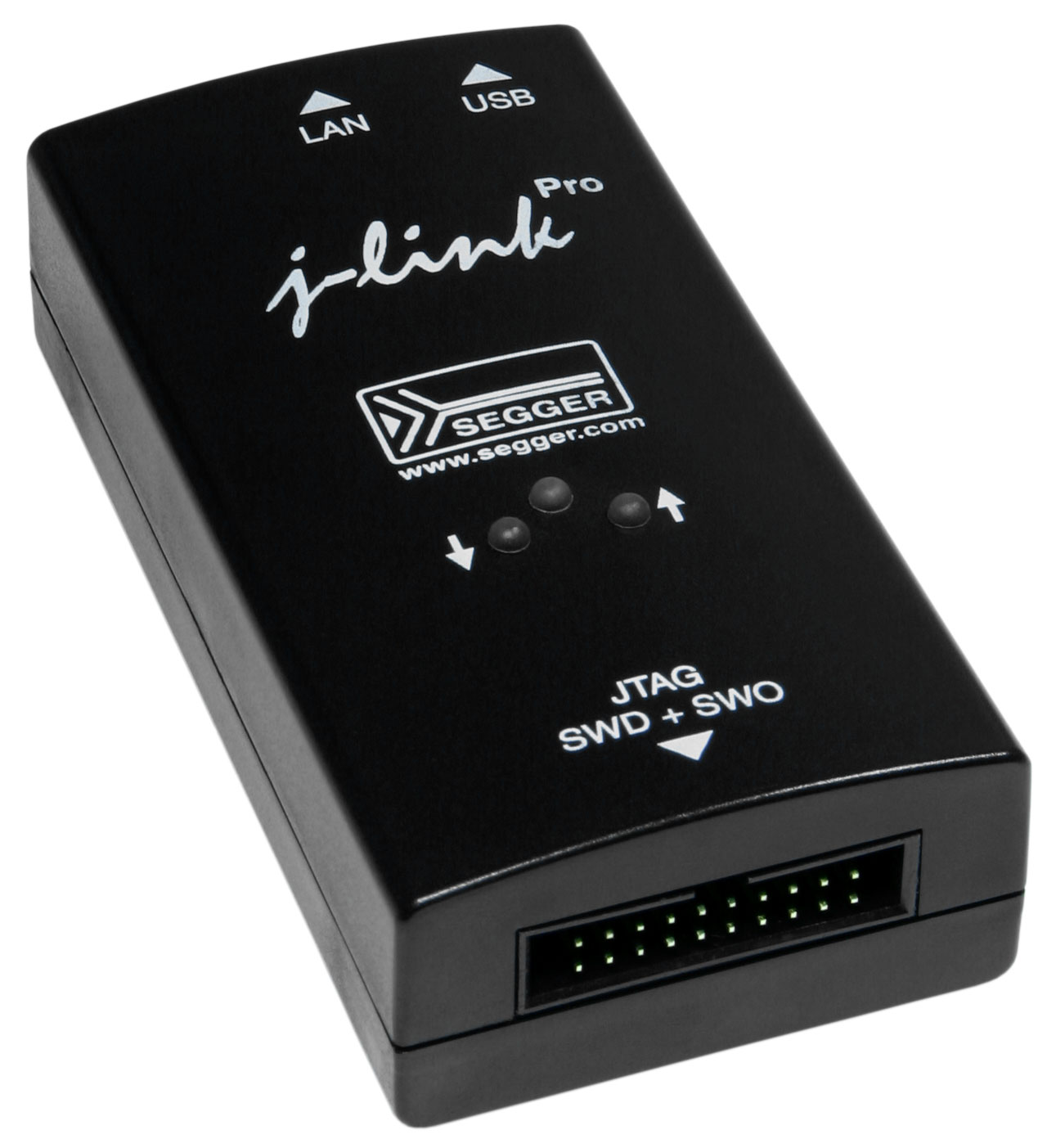
Segger J-Link PRO. Debug probe with SWD or JTAG interface to target ARM chip, and USB or Ethernet interfaces to host computer.

JTAG and/or SWD debug interface host adapters (in alphabetical order):

- Black Magic Probe by 1BitSquared.
- CMSIS-DAP by Mbed.
- Crossconnect by Rowley Associates.
- DSTREAM by ARM Holdings
- Green Hills Probe and SuperTrace Probe by Green Hills Software.
- iTAG by iSYSTEM.
- I-jet by IAR Systems.
- Jaguar by Crossware.
- J-Link by Segger Supports JTAG and SWD. Supports ARM7, ARM9, ARM11, Cortex-A, Cortex-M, Cortex-R, Renesas RX, Microchip PIC32. Eclipse plug-in available. Supports GDB, RDI, Ozone debuggers.
- J-Trace by Segger. Supports JTAG, SWD, and ETM trace on Cortex-M.
- JTAGjet by Signum.
- LPC-LINK by Embedded Artists (for NXP) This is only embedded on NXP LPCXpresso development boards.
- LPC-LINK 2 by NXP. This device can be reconfigured to support 3 different protocols: J-LINK by Segger, CMSIS-DAP by ARM, Redlink by Code Red.
- Multilink debug probes, Cyclone in-system programming/debugging interfaces, and a GDB Server plug-in for Eclipse-based ARM IDEs by PEmicro.
- OpenOCD open source GDB server supports a variety of JTAG probes OpenOCD Eclipse plug-in available in GNU ARM Eclipse Plug-ins.
  - AK-OPENJTAG by Artekit (Open JTAG-compatible).
  - AK-LINK by Artekit.
- PEEDI by RONETIX
- Debug Probe by Raspberry Pi.
- RLink by Raisonance.
- ST-LINK/V2 by STMicroelectronics The ST-LINK/V2 debugger embedded on STM32 Nucleo and Discovery development boards can be converted to SEGGER J-LINK protocol.
- TRACE32 Debugger and ETM/ITM Trace by Lauterbach.
- ULINK by Keil.

Debugging tools and/or debugging plug-ins (in alphabetical order):

- Memfault Error Analysis for post mortem debugging
- Percepio Tracealyzer, RTOS trace visualizer (with Eclipse plugin).
- Segger SystemView, RTOS trace visualizer.

== Real-time operating systems ==
Commonly referred to as RTOS:

- BeRTOS
- ChibiOS/RT
- CMSIS-RTOS2 (RTX)
- CoOS
- distortos
- eCos
- embKernel
- embOS
- ERIKA Enterprise
- FreeRTOS
- Hubris
- Integrity
- Milos
- mbed
- MQX RTOS
- Nucleus
- NuttX
- OSE
- pC/OS
- RTLinux
- RT-Thread
- RTEMS
- SCIOPTA
- ScmRTOS
- SDPOS
- ThreadX
- TI-RTOS
- TNKernel
- μC/OS-II, μC/OS-III
- μKOS
- Unison
- uT-kernel
- u-velOSity RTOS
- Zephyr

== C/C++ software libraries ==
The following are free C/C++ libraries:

- ARM Cortex libraries:
  - Cortex Microcontroller Software Interface Standard (CMSIS)
  - libopencm3 (formerly called libopenstm32)
  - libmaple for STM32F1 chips
  - LPCOpen for NXP LPC chips
- Alternate C standard libraries:
  - Bionic libc, dietlibc, EGLIBC, glibc, klibc, musl, Newlib, uClibc
- FAT file system libraries:
  - EFSL, FatFs, Petit FatFs
- Fixed-point math libraries:
  - libfixmath, fixedptc, FPMLib
- Encryption libraries:
  - Comparison of TLS implementations
  - wolfSSL

== Non-C/C++ computer languages and software libraries ==
- BASIC – Jumentum, open source
- BASIC – Coridium* BASIC – mikroBasic
- C# – NETMF
- Forth – MPE Forth
- Forth – Mecrisp-Stellaris, open source
- Embedded Java – MicroEJ, only for STM32 F2-J/F4-J microcontrollers
- Embedded Java – Renesas, Freescale, STMicroelectronics microcontrollers
- JavaScript – Espruino
- Lua – eLua
- Lua – Screvle
- Oberon – Astrobe
- Pascal – Free Pascal
- Pascal – mikroPascal
- Python – MicroPython
- Python – Python-on-a-chip
- Python - Zerynth
- Rust – Embedded Rust

== See also ==
- List of free and open-source software packages
- Comparison of real-time operating systems
- List of terminal emulators
