= Fefe =

Fefe may refer to:

- Fe'fe' language, a language spoken in parts of Cameroon
- Féfé (born 1976), real name Samuël Adebiyi, French rapper and hip hop artist of Nigerian origin
- Fefe Dobson, a Canadian singer-songwriter
- Fefe, nickname of Felix von Leitner, a German computer security expert and blogger
- Fefè is also a nickname, used in Sicily for somebody named Ferdinando
- "Fefe" (song), a song by the American rapper 6ix9ine

== See also ==
- U+FEFF, the Unicode character used to signal the byte order of a text file or stream
