= Segger =

Private company in the embedded systems industry

Segger Microcontroller
- Type: GmbH
- Industry: Embedded software
- Founded: 1992; 34 years ago
- Headquarters: Monheim am Rhein, Germany
- Products: Middleware components, JTAG development tools
- Website: www.segger.com

Segger Microcontroller is a private company involved in the embedded systems industry. It provides products used to develop and manufacture four categories of embedded systems: real-time operating systems (RTOS) and software libraries (middleware), debugging and trace probes, programming tools (integrated development environment (IDE), compiler, linker), and in-system programmers (Flasher line of products). The company is headquartered in Monheim am Rhein, Germany, with remote offices in Gardner, Massachusetts; Milpitas, California; and Shanghai, China.

== History ==
Segger Microcontroller was founded in 1992 by Rolf Segger in Hilden, Germany. The first product was the real-time operating system (RTOS), now named embOS. It was followed by emWin two years later. Initial products focused on RTOS and middleware products. However, the company later produced ISP-programming tools (Flasher) and debug probes (J-Link). In 2015, Segger introduced Embedded Studio, their cross-platform IDE for central processing units conforming to the ARM architecture, though recent versions are also used by RISC-V. All products are developed, maintained and updated in Germany except for Embedded Studio, which is primarily developed by a team of developers in the United Kingdom.

== Product categories ==
=== Debug and trace probes ===
Segger is most noted for its J-Link family, which supports JTAG (Joint Test Action Group) and SWD (Serial Wire Debug) debug probes for microcontrollers that have older ARM cores (ARM7, ARM9, ARM11), ARM Cortex-M cores (M0, M0+, M1, M3, M4, M7, M23, M33, M85), ARM Cortex-R cores (R4, R5, R8), ARM Cortex-A cores (A5, A7, A8, A9, A12, A15, A17, A53, A72), Renesas RX, Microchip PIC32, SiLab EFM8, RISC-V. It is also repackaged and sold as an OEM item by Analog Devices as the mIDASLink, Atmel as the SAM-ICE, Digi International as the Digi JTAG Link, and IAR Systems as the J-Link and the J-Link KS. This is the only JTAG emulator that can add Segger's patented flash breakpoint software to a debugger to enable the setting of multiple breakpoints in flash while running on an ARM device which is typically hindered by the limited availability of hardware breakpoints.

In the following table, the top group are trace devices, the bottom group are educational / hobbyist devices.

J-Trace & J-Link Models
Model	Host USB speed	Host Ethernet speed	Host Wi-Fi type	Target voltage range	Target Trace connector (pins, pitch)	Target Debug connector (pins, pitch)	Target download speed (max)	Target VCOM UART	Segger software features	Photo	Notes
J-Trace PRO (ARM & RISC-V)	3.0 SS	1 Gbit/s	None	1.2V to 5V	19-pins, 1.27mm (150 MHz)	20-pins, 2.54mm (50 MHz)	4 MByte/s	None	All		
J-Trace PRO Cortex-A/R/M	3.0 SS	1 Gbit/s	None	1.2V to 5V	19-pins, 1.27mm (150 MHz)	20-pins, 2.54mm (50 MHz)	4 MByte/s	None	All		
J-Trace PRO Cortex-M	3.0 SS	1 Gbit/s	None	1.2V to 5V	19-pins, 1.27mm (150 MHz)	20-pins, 2.54mm (50 MHz)	4 MByte/s	None	All		
J-Trace PRO RISC-V	3.0 SS	1 Gbit/s	None	1.2V to 5V	19-pins, 1.27mm (150 MHz)	20-pins, 2.54mm (50 MHz)	4 MByte/s	None	All		
J-Link PRO PoE	2.0 HS	100 Mbit/s (PoE)	None	1.2V to 5V	None	20-pins, 2.54mm (50 MHz)	4 MByte/s	2-pins (10M)	All		
J-Link PRO	2.0 HS	100 Mbit/s	None	1.2V to 5V	None	20-pins, 2.54mm (50 MHz)	4 MByte/s	2-pins (10M)	All		Newer model has a different case
J-Link ULTRA+	2.0 HS	None	None	1.2V to 5V	None	20-pins, 2.54mm (50 MHz)	4 MByte/s	2-pins (10M)	All		Newer model has a different case
J-Link WiFi	2.0 HS	None	802.11b/g/n (2.4GHz)	1.2V to 5V	None	20-pins, 2.54mm (15 MHz)	1 MByte/s	2-pins (115.2K)	All		Newer model has a different case
J-Link PLUS, J-Link PLUS Compact	2.0 HS	None	None	1.2V to 5V	None	20-pins, 2.54mm (15 MHz)	1 MByte/s	2-pins (115.2K)	All		Newer full-size model has a different case. Compact model functionally identical to larger model.
J-Link BASE, J-Link BASE Compact	2.0 HS	None	None	1.2V to 5V	None	20-pins, 2.54mm (15 MHz)	1 MByte/s	2-pins (115.2K)	Limited		Newer full-size model has a different case. Compact model functionally identical to larger model.
J-Link EDU (discontinued)	2.0 HS	None	None	1.2V to 5V	None	20-pins, 2.54mm (15 MHz)	1 MByte/s	2-pins (115.2K)	Limited		Discontinued model
J-Link EDU Mini	2.0 FS	None	None	1.8V to 3.3V, (3.3V-only for older model)	None	9-pins, 1.27mm (4 MHz)	0.2 MByte/s	None	Limited		Newer model has a translucent case
J-Link OB (on board)	2.0 FS	None	None	Depends	None	Integrated on dev board (2 to 4 MHz)	0.1 to 0.2; MByte/s	Depends	Limited		

- Note: Further models are J-Link LITE ARM, J-Link LITE CortexM, J-Link LITE RX, J-Link OEM.
- Note: Software options vary by model: J-Flash, J-Flash-SPI, Ozone, RDDI, RDI, Unlimited Flash Breakponts.
- Note: The EDU & EDU Mini models cannot be used for commercial software development, also doesn't come with J-Flash, J-Flash-SPI, RDDI, RDI options.
- Note: Adapters and isolators are available to convert the 20-pin 0.1"/2.54mm male shrouded (box) header to another target board connector.
- Note: The compact variants are functionally identical to their larger variants.

== See also ==
- Embedded system
- Single-board microcontroller
- List of ARM microprocessor cores
- GNU Debugger
