= Keil (company) =

German technology company

- Industry: Embedded Software
- Founded: 1986
- Headquarters: Munich; Plano
- Products: compiler, assemblers, debuggers, linkers, IDE, real-time operating systems, evaluation boards
- Website: keil.com; keil.arm.com

Keil is a German software subsidiary of Arm Holdings. It was founded in 1982 by Günter and Reinhard Keil, initially as a German GbR.

== Overview ==
In April 1985 the company was converted to Keil Elektronik GmbH to market add-on products for the development tools provided by many of the silicon vendors.

Keil provides a broad range of development tools like ANSI C compiler, macro assemblers, debuggers and simulators, linkers, IDE, library managers, real-time operating systems (currently RTX5) and evaluation boards for over 8,500 devices.

In October 2005, Keil (Keil Elektronik GmbH in Munich, Germany, and Keil Software, Inc. in Plano, Texas) were acquired by Arm.

Since the merger with Arm, the company is still active in providing products and services.

== See also ==
- Arm Holdings
- ARM architecture family
- Embedded system
- Mbed
