= Flipper Zero =

Multi-tool electronic device

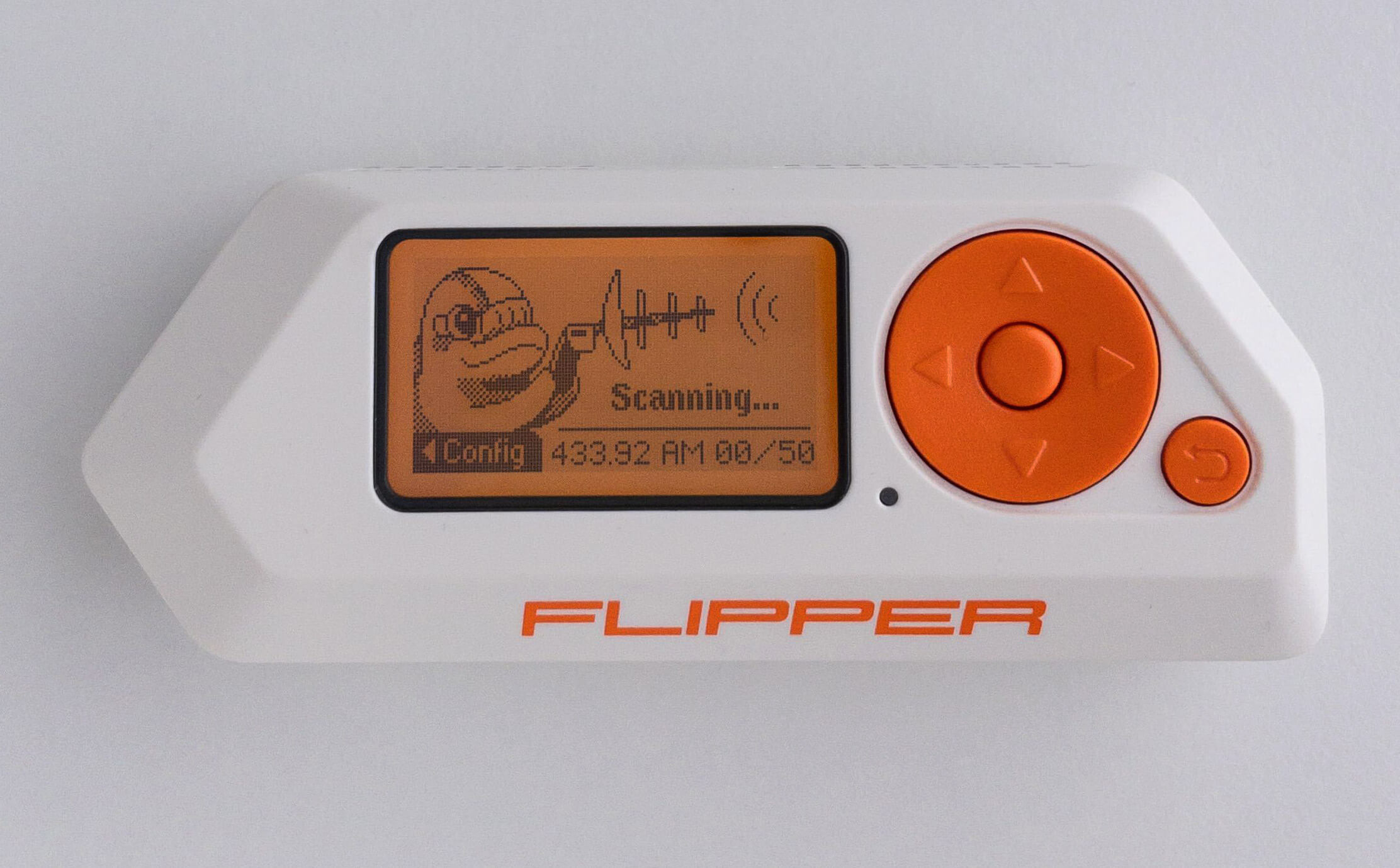
- Flipper Zero running Sub-GHz radio scanning mode
- Manufacturer: Flipper Devices Inc.
- Released: August 2020
- Operating system: FreeRTOS
- CPU: STMicroelectronics STM32WB55
- Memory: 256 KB RAM; 1024 KB Flash
- Removable storage: Micro SD (up to 256 GB)
- Display: Monochrome LCD; 1.4-inch, 128 × 64 pixels
- Sound: Buzzer (100–2,500 Hz): 87 dB
- Connectivity: NFC; 125 kHz RFID; Sub-1 GHz Radio; Infrared transceiver; GPIO pins; Bluetooth LE; USB 2.0; 1-Wire
- Power: LiPo 2,000 mAh
- Dimensions: 100 x 40 x 25 mm
- Weight: 104 grams (3.7 oz)
- Successor: Flipper One
- Website: flipper.net

The Flipper Zero is a portable multi-functional security device developed for interaction with access control systems. The device is able to read, copy, and emulate RFID and NFC tags, radio remotes, iButtons, and digital access keys. It also has a GPIO interface. It was first announced in August 2020 through the Kickstarter crowdfunding campaign, which raised $4.8 million. The first devices were delivered to backers 18 months after completion of the crowdfunding campaign. The device's user interface embodies a pixel art dolphin virtual pet. The interaction with the virtual pet is the device's core game mechanic. The usage of the device's functions defines the appearance and emotions of the pet.

In the built-in game, the main mechanism to "upgrade" the dolphin is to use the various hacking tools. While harmless uses (like as a remote control for a television, or carbon dioxide sensor) exist, some of the built-in tools have potential criminal uses, including RFID skimming, Bluetooth spamming (spamming a Bluetooth connection, crashing a person's phone), and emulation of RFID chips such as those found in identification badges, using the built-in radio cloner to open garage doors, unlocking cars, and functioning as a wireless BadUSB.

== Origin ==
The device was developed by Alex Kulagin and Pavel Zhovner in 2019. They started raising funds on Kickstarter.

== Overview ==
Flipper Zero is designed for interaction with various types of access control systems, radio protocols, RFID, near-field communication (NFC), and infrared signals. To operate the device, a computer or a smartphone is not required; it can be controlled via a 5-position D-pad and a separate back button. Flipper Zero has a monochrome orange backlight LCD screen with a resolution of 128 × 64 pixels. For connection with external modules, the device has general-purpose input/output (GPIO) pinholes on the top side. User data and firmware updates are stored on a microSD card. Some actions, such as firmware or user data update, require a connection to a computer or a smartphone with the developer's software installed.

In July 2023, an app store was opened for the device.

== Technical specification ==
The electronic schematics and firmware of the Flipper Zero project are open source under the GNU General Public License. However, the device is not considered fully open-source hardware because complete printed circuit board layout files are not publicly available, making it more difficult for third parties to reproduce the hardware.

=== Hardware ===
Flipper Zero's hardware consists of four PCB modules connected by flexible cables. The battery is positioned in the center of the device between three of the PCBs.

- Main PCB (motherboard) – contains core components, including the main processor (STM32WB55), GPIO breakout pins, LCD, Sub-GHz chip and its antenna, Bluetooth antenna, microSD card slot, battery controller, USB Type-C port, and membrane switches for the D-pad. All additional PCBs connect to the main PCB via flexible cables.
- Infrared and iButton PCB – a small board equipped with an infrared receiver (TSOP-75338) and three infrared LEDs for transmitting infrared signals. Includes three pogo pins for iButton (1-Wire) tags and a piezo buzzer (BCE-MX8530A) for audio feedback.
- NFC PCB – contains the NFC chip (STM ST25R3916) along with analog circuitry for 125 kHz RFID.
- Dual-Band RFID Antenna PCB – features two passive coil antennas: one for 13.56 MHz NFC communication and another for 125 kHz RFID systems.
- BlueTooth: STMicroelectronics STM32WB55, a dual-core ARM microcontroller that has an integrated Bluetooth Low Energy (BLE) radio

==== Microcontroller (MCU) ====
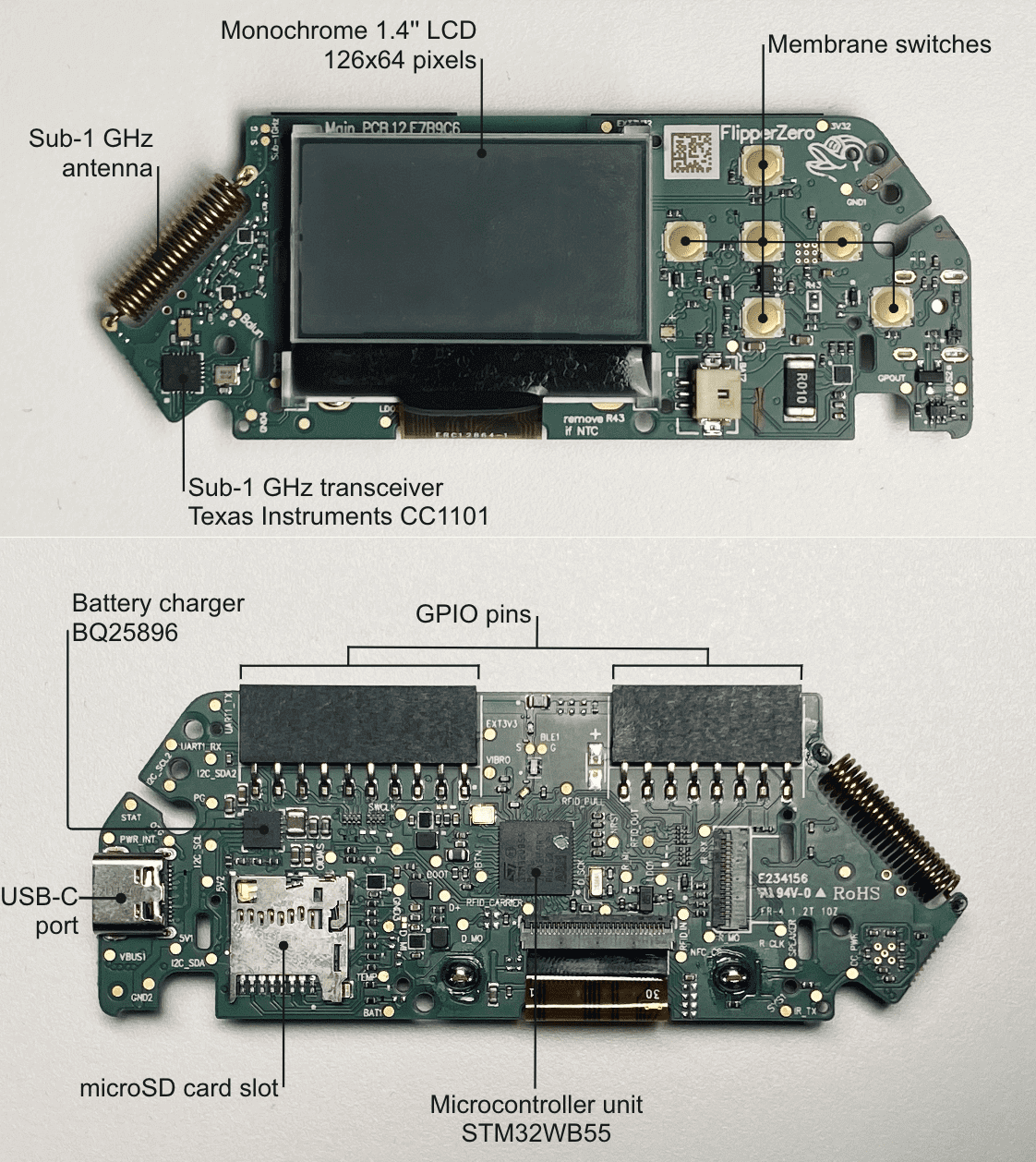
Flipper Zero main board

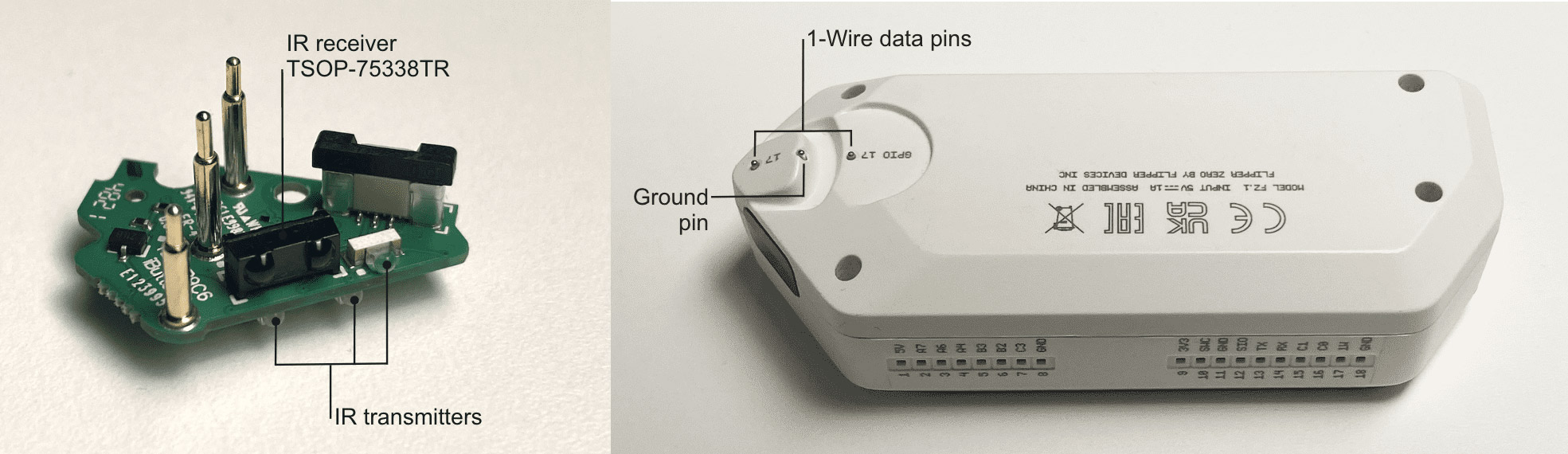
Infrared board and iButton pogo pins

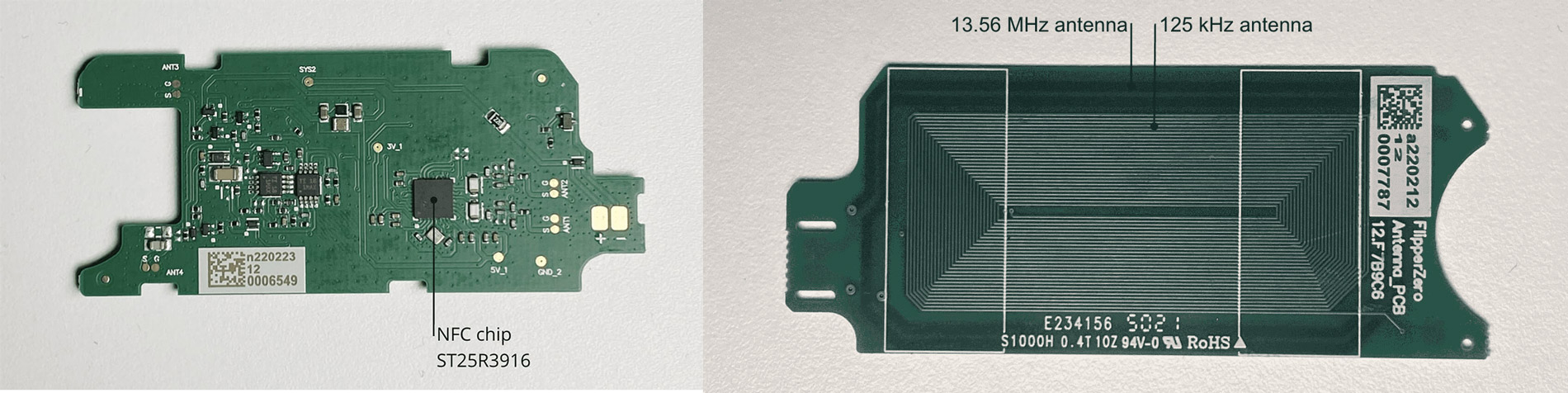
NFC PCB and dual-band RFID antenna

Flipper Zero is based on a dual-core ARM architecture STM32WB55 microcontroller, which has 256 KB of RAM and 1 MB of Flash storage. The first core is a 64 MHz Cortex-M4 which runs the main firmware. The second core is a 32 MHz Cortex-M0 which runs STMicroelectronics proprietary firmware that implements the Bluetooth Low Energy protocol. Secret keys stored in the Secure Enclave of STM32WB55 are used to decrypt cryptographic keys on the fly, which are then applied to decode Sub-GHz protocols. This mechanism allows the device to handle encrypted communication for Sub-GHz protocols. However, the encryption used is not entirely secure and primarily serves as a form of obfuscation rather than robust protection. Its purpose is to make reverse engineering more challenging, but it does not provide absolute security.

==== Sub-GHz radio ====
For radio transmitting and receiving in the 300–900 MHz radio frequency range, a Texas Instruments CC1101 chip is used, which supports amplitude-shift keying (ASK) and frequency-shift keying (FSK) modulations. Unlike software-defined radio, the CC1101 chip cannot capture raw radio signals. This limitation requires the user to pre-configure the modulation parameters before receiving a radio signal, otherwise the signal will be received incorrectly.

==== Infrared ====
The infrared transceiver in Flipper Zero consists of a digital receiver and an LED circuit. The receiver, based on the TSOP-75338 module, decodes incoming infrared signals. Infrared transmission is managed by three LEDs directly connected to the MCU, which controls the signal output.

==== NFC and 125 kHz RFID ====
The NFC subsystem is based on the STM ST25R3916 chip, which is responsible for reading and emulating high-frequency cards. The 125 kHz low-frequency RFID functionality in Flipper Zero is implemented primarily through software running on the MCU, without a dedicated RFID chip. It also supports reading RFID tags in the 110–140 kHz range, albeit with a reduced reading distance.

==== Hardware expansion ====
In February 2024, a video game module was released for the Flipper Zero by its makers. The device allows the Flipper to be used as a game controller or connected to a TV and is based around the Raspberry Pi Pico.

=== Firmware ===
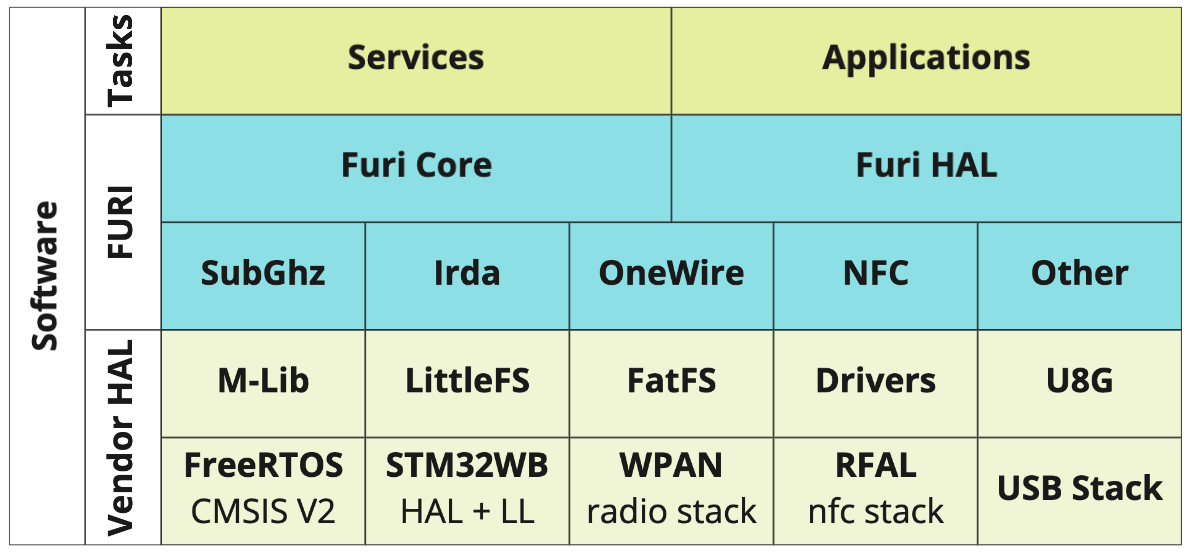
Flipper Zero firmware architecture

The Flipper Zero firmware is based on the FreeRTOS operating system, with its own software abstraction over the hardware layer. The firmware is mostly written in the C programming language, with occasional use of C++ in third-party modules. The system uses multitasking in combination with an event-driven architecture to organize the interaction of applications and services executed in a single address space and communicating through a system of queues and events. The system can be executed from both random-access memory (RAM) and read-only memory (ROM). Execution from RAM is used to deliver over-the-air (OTA) firmware updates.

The firmware consists of the following components:

- FuriCore – provides an API for interaction with the scheduler and multithreading. FuriCore abstracts and extends the functionality of the FreeRTOS scheduler and adds additional system primitives.
- FuriHal – provides an API for interaction with hardware.
- Services and applications – the main functionality of the device. Sub-GHz, Infrared, RFID, NFC, etc are applications for user interaction. Graphical user interface (GUI), command-line interface (CLI), Notification, Storage, etc are additional APIs for applications development.
- A set of libraries and drivers – covers various communication protocols, device drivers, file system drivers, and developer tools.

User and system data is stored in built-in flash memory, which is based on the LittleFS library. Interaction with the file system on the SD card is implemented using the FatFs library.

The build system is based on the SCons tool with additional tooling written in Python. For compilation, the system uses its own open toolchain based on GNU Compiler Collection.

== Applications ==
=== Sub-GHz ===
Flipper Zero has a built-in module that can read, store, and emulate remote controls, allowing it to receive and send radio frequencies between 300 and 928 MHz. These switches, radio locks, wireless doorbells, remote controls, barriers, gates, smart lighting, and other devices can all be operated with these controls. Using Sub-GHz Flipper Zero can also receive and decode the data from many weather stations.

=== 125 kHz RFID ===
Flipper Zero is compatible with low-frequency (LF) radio frequency identification (RFID), which is used in supply chain tracking systems, animal chips, and access control systems. LF RFID cards typically don't offer high levels of security, in contrast to NFC cards. Numerous form factors of this technology are available, including plastic cards, key fobs, tags, wristbands, and animal microchips. A low-frequency RFID module in the Flipper Zero can read, save, simulate, and write LF RFID cards.

=== NFC ===
NFC technology, which is used in smart cards for access control and cards, and digital business cards, is compatible with Flipper Zero. The 13.56 MHz NFC module has the ability to imitate, read, and store these cards. An NFC card is a transponder with a unique identification (UID), and rewritable memory for data storage. When placed close to a reader, NFC cards transmit the needed data.

=== Infrared ===
Flipper Zero can read and transmit signals that use infrared light (IR) such as TVs, air conditioners, or audio devices. It can learn and save infrared remote controls or use its own Universal remotes.

=== GPIO and modules ===
Flipper Zero explores hardware, flash firmware, debugging, and fuzz. It is able to function as a USB converter for UART, SPI, or I2C. The built-in GPIO pins connect to hardware, operate by buttons, send out code, and display messages on the LCD screen.

=== iButton ===
The Flipper Zero has an iButton connector to allow it to read and emulate iButton contact keys.

=== BadUSB ===
BadUSB devices have the ability to alter system settings, unlock backdoors, recover data, launch reverse shells, and do any other physical access-based actions. Flipper Zero can function as a BadUSB and, when connected to an insecure computing device, acts as a keyboard-like Human interface device (HID). Commands (the payload) are injected and executed using DuckyScript (the macro scripting language developed as part of the 'USB Rubber Ducky' BadUSB project). Mitigating BadUSB execution typically requires endpoint safeguards such as hardware USB port whitelisting or keystroke-timing behavioral analysis, as operating systems trust human interface devices by default.

=== U2F (Universal 2nd Factor) ===
- Use the flipper as a second authentication factor for your Google account and others

=== HID controllers ===
Flipper Zero can replace certain HID (human interface device) controllers. This allows it to interact with your phone or computer. It can remotely control media players, computer keyboards or mouse, presentations, and more.

- Keynote: Presentations remote
- Keyboard: Double as a keyboard for a computer
- Media: Controls media on a computer, camera remote control for a phone
- Mouse: Double as a mouse for a computer
- TikTok Controller: Control TikTok app on a phone
- Mouse Jiggler: Duplicate mouse movements on a computer to keep computer showing as active at all times
- PTT : use the flipper as a push to talk (PTT) controller / wireless PTT remote

== Bans, seizure, police bulletin and other incidents ==
=== U.S. Customs seizure and release ===
In late 2022, U.S. Customs and Border Protection seized a shipment of 15,000 devices, but they were eventually released.

=== Amazon ban ===
On 7 April 2023, Amazon banned sales of the Flipper Zero via their site for being a "card skimming device".

=== Brazil seizures ===
In 2023 people in Brazil who ordered Flipper Zeros reported that their orders had been seized by Anatel. According to the Electronic Frontier Foundation, Anatel has flagged the devices as being a tool for criminal purposes, making the certification process complicated. Users have tried getting their devices certified, but to no avail. The EFF has said that the seizures would limit the ability of Brazilian cybersecurity researchers to conduct research, as they have legitimate uses for the device.

=== Police bulletin on Flipper Zero ===
In August 2023, The Daily Dot published an article on a bulletin for police officers published by the South Dakota Fusion Centre. The document suggested that extremists might use the device to bypass access control systems controls, particularly on power stations. The bulletin admitted there was no concrete evidence of plans by said extremists to use the device, though interest had been expressed on online forums.

Flipper CEO Pavel Zhovner was shown a copy of the bulletin and said that the Flipper Zero had been deliberately designed to not affect modern access control systems. He also pointed out that the bulletin itself said that gates at power stations were not inherently vulnerable to the device but that older gates might be.

=== Gatwick seizure ===
On 27 September 2023 a security staff member at Gatwick Airport confiscated a Flipper Zero from Vitor Domingos due to security concerns. The device was then handed over to Sussex Police.

=== Midwest FurFest Bluetooth Low Energy attack ===
In September 2023 the ability to launch Bluetooth Low Energy spam attacks with a Flipper Zero was demonstrated by a security researcher known as 'Techryptic'. A custom Flipper Zero firmware was developed shortly afterward that could launch spam attacks against Android devices and Microsoft Windows computers. An Android app to launch BLE attacks was developed shortly afterwards.

At the 2023 Midwest FurFest attendees reported severe disruption of Square payment readers and an insulin pump controller crashed due to the BLE spam. A researcher known as Remy said to Bleeping Computer: "For BTLE enabled medical equipment, at minimum a disruption results in a degraded quality of life for those affected," adding "Some conditions may not be life threatening to have disruptions. Others may not be so lucky."

As a result, a Python script was developed, called the Wall of Flippers project for Linux and Windows to detect BLE spam attacks coming from Flipper and Android devices.

=== Proposed Canadian ban ===
In February 2024, Innovation, Science, and Economic Development Canada announced that they had the intention of banning the Flipper Zero and other devices that could be used to clone wireless signals for remote entry in response to a significant increase in auto thefts.

On 20 March 2024, ISED announced that it would seek to restrict use of the device by illegitimate actors, but not ban it outright.
