= RT-Thread =

Real-time operating system

- Developer: Bernard Xiong & RT-Thread Team
- Written in: C
- Working state: Current
- Source model: Open source
- Initial release: 2006; 20 years ago
- Latest release: 5.2.1 / May 30, 2025; 16 months ago
- Repository: github.com/RT-Thread/rt-thread
- Marketing target: Embedded systems, IoT
- Supported platforms: ARM (Cortex-M0, -M3, -M4, -M7, -M23, -R4, -A8, -A9; ARM7, ARM9, ARM11), MIPS32, RISC-V, ARC, TMS320 DSP, C-Sky, x86
- Kernel type: Monolithic
- License: Apache 2.0
- Official website: www.rt-thread.io

RT-Thread is an open-source real-time operating system (RTOS) for embedded systems and Internet of things (IoT). It is developed by the RT-Thread Development Team based in China. RT-Thread is aimed to change the current situation in China that there is no well used open-source real-time operating system in the microcontroller field.

As of August 2020, RT-Thread was reported to be #3 on the list of RTOSes with the largest number of contributors (behind Zephyr and Mbed).

== Variants ==
In 2006, RT-Thread began as an open-source real-time operating system (RTOS) that is mainly written in the programming language C. In 2017, a second variant was released for resource-constrained microcontrollers; it needs a minimum of 3 kB flash memory or read-only memory (ROM) and 1.2 kB random-access memory (RAM). Also, RT-Thread's first variant was named Standard, and second variant was named Nano.

== See also ==
- Comparison of real-time operating systems
