= Felix von Leitner =

German IT security expert

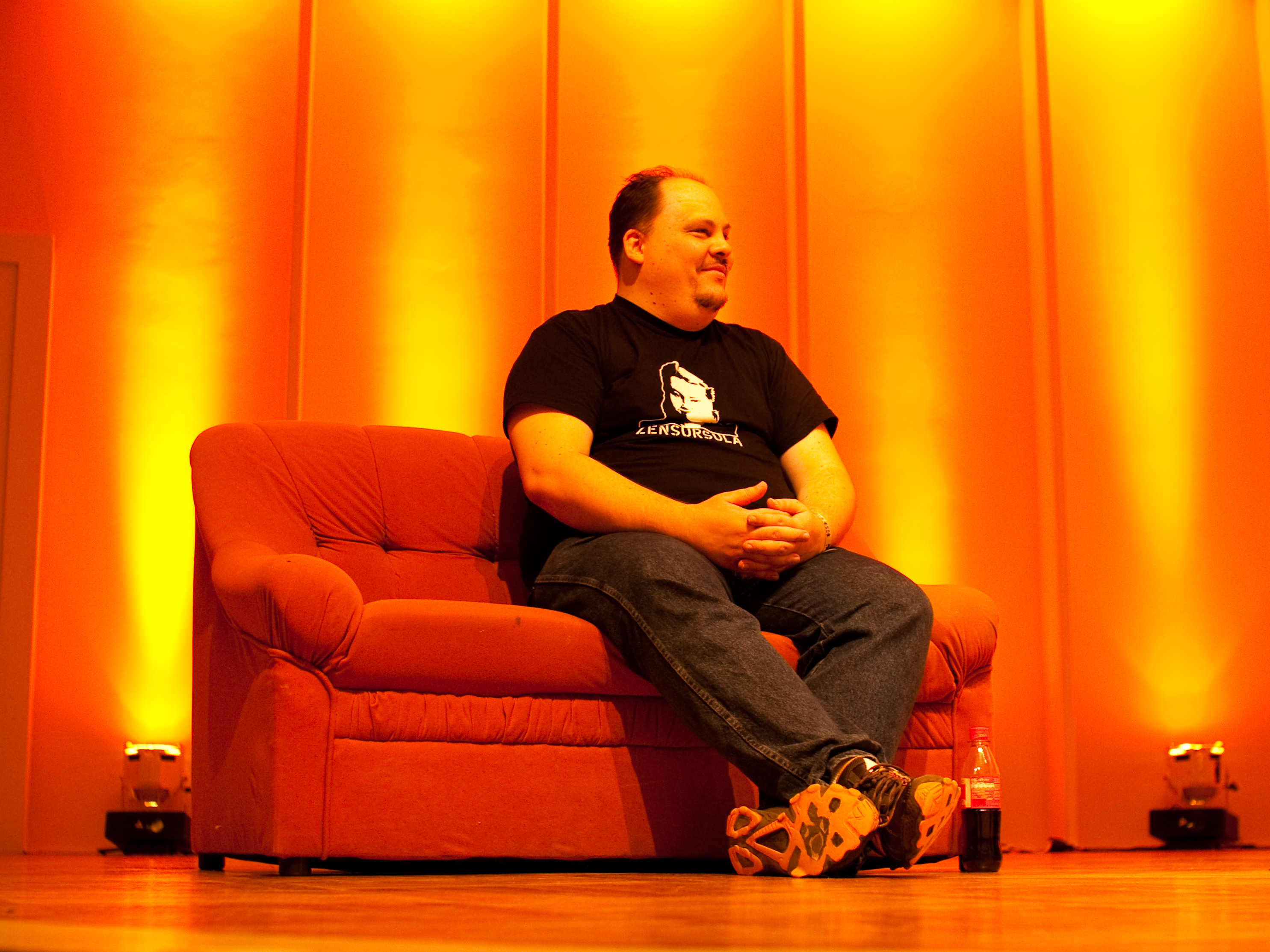
- Felix von Leitner at Chaos Communication Congress 2009
- Occupation: IT security expert
- Known for: dietlibc, blog posts, activism

Felix von Leitner (* 1973), nicknamed Fefe, is a German IT security expert living in Berlin. He is the main author of the dietlibc, a C standard library. His personal blog posts have received larger media coverage in Germany.

== Biography ==
In 2006, he analysed disadvantages of the planned "Gesundheitskarte" (health card).

He played a crucial role in distributing videos of a case of abusive policing on the 2009 Freiheit statt Angst ("Freedom instead of fear") demonstration, that in the end led to the obligation of the Berlin police to wear identification badges.

In 2011, prior to the publication of Mac OS X Lion, he accused Apple of doing too little for its security.

Felix von Leitner was a long term member of the Chaos Computer Club Berlin (CCC).

In June 2025, his business partner and personal friend announced on social media that von Leitner had suffered a stroke and was in the process of recovering. Prior to the announcement, speculation regarding his whereabouts had circulated within the community surrounding von Leitner’s blog, which had not been updated for a longer-than-usual period.
