= Bluetooth advertising =

Mobile marketing using Bluetooth technology

Bluetooth advertising is a method of mobile marketing that utilizes Bluetooth technology to deliver content such as message, information, or advertisement to mobile devices such as cellular phones or tablet computers. Bluetooth advertising can also be received via laptop or personal digital assistants (PDAs).

Bluetooth advertising is permission based advertising, which means that when a mobile device has received a Bluetooth message, the recipient has the choice to either accept or decline the message. The recipient needs to positively indicate that they wish to receive marketing messages.

While not all users of Bluetooth-mobile devices leave their Bluetooth activated, they can interact with a sign to encourage them to turn on their Bluetooth to receive the content. The advertiser is required to explain that those marketing messages may contain information about other companies’ products and services, if appropriate. It is highly recommended that the Direct Marketing Associations guidelines are used.

== Bluetooth advertising proximity range ==
Bluetooth advertising generally is a broadcast function. The average range of Bluetooth advertising in class two is 15 meters to 40 meters for most Bluetooth enabled mobile devices.

As with all wireless transmission, the range and accessibility to most Bluetooth advertising depends on the transmitter power class and the individual portage of the receiver equipment. However, with advances in mobile devices technology, this distance for proper receiving is increasing to reach 250 meters or more in nowadays smart phones, tablet computers and other mobile devices.

The selectivity goes down with extension of range. Hence the transmission power raise as well as receiver sensitivity raise will reduce the contextual connection between actual location of receiver and contents of broadcast message.

There are several major types of Bluetooth advertising solutions. These are generally Bluetooth dongles as transmitter hardware in conjunction with mostly USB networked common server functions.

Embedded scheduling software serves transmission via dongles to enabled Bluetooth receivers. As Bluetooth reception modes require battery power, the distribution depends on the preparedness of the bearers of receiver units for receiving such transmission.

== Bluetooth advertising content types ==
Bluetooth advertising can send file formats like image files, ring tone files, vCard, barcodes, audio files, Java applications, mobile applications, video files, text files and theoretically any file format mobile devices can handle.

There are two types of possible communications in Bluetooth 1-Broadcasting or 2-Connection. Broadcasting doesn't need pairing (connection). Broadcaster will send data along with its ID and any receiver can receive it by recognizing that ID. It is best suited for gaming where one device has to continuously send its status to other devices.

Apple provides this feature through iBeacon but one can develop their own.

== Today ==
Research has found that proximity marketers failed to construct a viable platform capable of monetizing proximity due to three factors: scalability, exclusivity, and visibility.

== Bluetooth advertising applications ==
Bluetooth advertising applications include:

- Broadcast location-based coupons.
- Contextual advertising.
- Localized information.
- Gaming and music.
- Content on demand.
- Specific and targeted campaign.
