= Dietlibc =

Implementation of C standard library

dietlibc
- Developer: Felix von Leitner
- Stable release: 0.35 / October 31, 2024; 23 months ago
- Operating system: Linux
- Platform: Alpha, ARM, PA-RISC, IA-64, i386, MIPS, s390x, SPARC, PowerPC
- Type: Runtime library
- License: GPLv2
- Website: www.fefe.de/dietlibc/

dietlibc is a C standard library subset released under the GNU General Public License Version 2, and proprietary licenses are also available. It was developed with the help of about 100 volunteers by Felix von Leitner with the goal to compile and link programs to the smallest possible size. dietlibc was developed from scratch and thus only implements the most important and commonly used functions. It is mainly used in embedded devices.

== See also ==
- C standard libraries
