= Open JTAG =

- Original author(s): Ruben Mileca
- Repository: opencores.org/websvn/listing/openjtag-project
- Written in: VHDL
- License: LGPL
- Website: www.openjtag.org

The Open JTAG project is an open source project released under GNU License.

It is a complete hardware and software JTAG reference design, based on a simple hardware composed by a FTDI FT245 USB front-end and an Altera EPM570 MAX II CPLD. The capabilities of this hardware configuration make the Open JTAG device able to output TCK signals at 24 MHz using macro-instructions sent from the host end.

The scope is to give the community a JTAG device not based on the PC parallel port: Open JTAG uses the USB channel to communicate with the internal CPLD, sending macro-instructions as fast as possible. The complete project (Beta version) is available at OpenCores.org and the Open JTAG project official site.
