= List of semiconductor IP core vendors =

The following is a list of notable vendors in the business of licensing IP cores.

== Artificial Intelligence / Machine Learning / GEMM Accelerators ==
- Akeana
- Quadric GPNPU processors

== Analog-to-digital converters (ADC) ==
- Cadence Design Systems
- Cosmic Circuits
- Dolphin Semiconductor
- S3 Group
- Synopsys

== Broadband modem and error correction ==
- Cadence Design Systems
- CEVA, Inc.
- IMEC
- On2 Technologies (through acquisition of Hantro)
- Synopsys (through acquisition of Virage Logic)
- Tensilica (now part of Cadence Design Systems)

== Digital-to-analog converters (DAC) ==
- Cadence Design Systems
- Cosmic Circuits (now part of Cadence Design Systems)
- Dolphin Semiconductor
- S3 Group

== Digital signal processors (DSP) ==
- Synopsys - ARC
- Tensilica - Xtensa (now part of Cadence Design Systems)

== DRAM ==
=== DRAM controllers ===
- Actel
- Altera
- Arm Holdings
- Barco Silex
- Cadence Design Systems (through acquisition of Denali Software)
- Faraday Technology
- Lattice Semiconductor
- Rambus
- Synopsys
- Xilinx (acquired by AMD)

=== DRAM PHYs ===
- Arm Holdings
- Cadence Design Systems (through acquisition of Denali Software)
- Synopsys (through acquisition of Virage Logic)

=== High-bandwidth memory - HBM PHYs ===
- eSilicon
- Rambus
- Synopsys

=== Hybrid memory cube - HMC Controllers ===
- Open-Silicon
- University of Heidelberg

== Communication IP ==
=== Network-on-chip (NoC) / On-chip interconnect ===
- Akeana
- Arteris IP
- Arm Holdings

=== Bluetooth SW stack, link layer, and PHY ===
- Arm Holdings (through acquisition of Dicentric and Sunrise Micro Devices)

=== Ethernet PHY ===
- Arm Holdings (through acquisition of Artisan Components)
- Cadence Design Systems

=== V-by-One ===
- Socionext - HV Series

== General-purpose microprocessors ==
- Akeana
- Andes Technology, Codasip, SiFive, and others - RISC-V
- Arm Holdings - Arm Cortex and Neoverse processor cores
- CAST - RISC-V, 8051, 80251, with ASIL-D-ready certification
- CEVA, Inc. - CEVA-X DSP
- Dolphin Semiconductor - 8051, 80251
- eSi-RISC - eSi-RISC
- Freescale and others - ColdFire
- IBM and others - PowerPC/Power ISA
- Infineon Technologies - TricoreA
- MIPS Technologies - MIPS architecture
- OpenCores - OpenRISC
- Renesas - SuperH
- Socionext - Fujitsu FR
- Sun Microsystems and others - OpenSPARC
- Synopsys - ARC
- Tensilica - Xtensa (now part of Cadence Design Systems)
- Western Design Center - 6502, 65816, 65xx
- Xilinx (acquired by AMD) - MicroBlaze

== Graphics processing units (GPU) ==
- AMD
- Arm Holdings
- Imagination Technologies
- Intel
- NVidia

== FPGA ==
- Altera
- Xilinx (acquired by AMD)

== Embedded FPGA (eFPGA) ==
- Menta SAS

== HDMI ==
- Silicon Image
- Synopsys

== ISP ==
- Silicon Image
- Socionext - Milbeaut

== I/O pad libraries ==
- Arm Holdings (through acquisition of Artisan Components)
- Faraday Technology
- Synopsys
- TSMC

== On-chip SRAMs ==
- Arm Holdings (through acquisition of Artisan Components)
- Dolphin Semiconductor
- eSilicon
- Synopsys (through acquisition of Virage Logic)

== Phase-locked loops (PLL) ==
- Arm Holdings (through acquisition of Artisan Components)
- Cadence Design Systems
- CEVA, Inc.
- Cosmic Circuits
- S3 Group
- TSMC

== Power management ==
- S3 Group
- Cosmic Circuits
- Dolphin Semiconductor
- SiliconGate Lda

== Serial ATA (SATA) controllers ==
- CEVA, Inc.
- Synopsys Inc.

== Standard cell libraries ==
- Arm Holdings (through acquisition of Artisan Components)
- Faraday Technology
- NanGate
- Silvaco (through acquisition of Dolphin Integration's libraries)
- Synopsys

== Video processors and computer graphics ==
- Arm Holdings (through acquisition of Falanx and Logipard)
- CEVA, Inc.
- Chips&Media Specializes in video codecs, image signal processing, and deep learning-based computer vision system (super-resolution).
- Google (through acquisition of On2 Technologies)
- Imagination Technologies
- intoPIX - Specializes in lightweight low latency image, video and sensor compression, including JPEG XS IP, TicoRAW IP and others.
- Silicon Image
- Socionext - HEVC/H.265, SEERIS 2.5D Graphics IP
- Vivante Corporation (offers GPU IP solutions for applications in the mobile, consumer, automotive, embedded, real time/mission critical, and home entertainment markets.)
