= Free Silicon Foundation =

- Abbreviation: F-Si
- Formation: December 19, 2018; 7 years ago
- Type: Association under Article 60 of the Swiss Civil Code
- Purpose: Promotion of free and open-source electronic design automation tools, copyleft hardware licensing, and open standards for integrated circuit design
- Headquarters: Belp, Switzerland
- President: Luca Alloatti
- Website: f-si.org

The Free Silicon Foundation (F-Si) is a Swiss association that promotes free and open-source electronic design automation (EDA) tools, the sharing of integrated circuit designs under copyleft licences, and the use of common standards in semiconductor design. The foundation organizes the annual Free Silicon Conference (FSiC), publishes policy recommendations on open-source silicon to the European Commission, and is developing the Hardware General Public License (HGPL), a copyleft licence for chip designs.

== History ==
The Free Silicon Foundation was founded on 19 December 2018 as an association under Article 60 of the Swiss Civil Code, registered in Belp, Switzerland. Its founding goals were the promotion of free and open-source computer-aided design tools for VLSI circuits, the sharing of hardware designs, common standards, and user freedom in silicon technology.

Among the co-founders are Luca Alloatti, a silicon photonics researcher who, during a postdoctoral position at MIT, contributed to the first microprocessor using optical interconnects, and Thomas Kramer, an electrical engineer trained at ETH Zurich; Alloatti has described the foundation's mission as an application of the free software movement's ideas to silicon. The foundation is also managed by Matthias Köfferlein, author of the layout viewer KLayout. F-Si is part of the Next Generation Internet Zero (NGI0) consortium.

An affiliated Italian association, the Free Silicon Foundation (I) ETS, shares the foundation's mission and has participated in projects funded by the European Union.

== Free Silicon Conference ==
The foundation's main public activity is the Free Silicon Conference (FSiC), an annual gathering of developers of open-source EDA tools, open hardware designers, and researchers. The conference covers the integrated-circuit design process from system architecture to physical layout and verification.

Editions of the conference have taken place at Sorbonne University in Paris (2019, 2022, 2023 and 2024), at the IHP – Leibniz Institute for High Performance Microelectronics in Frankfurt (Oder), Germany (2025), and at the University of Ljubljana Faculty of Electrical Engineering in Ljubljana, Slovenia, on 6–8 July 2026. According to IHP, the 2025 edition was among the most significant European events dedicated to open design tools and the open-source silicon ecosystem, bringing together engineers, scientists, and industry and government representatives.

The conference has been co-funded by the European Union through the GoIT coordination and support action and by the Swiss State Secretariat for Education, Research and Innovation (SERI) under the NGI0 Commons Fund of the Horizon Europe programme.

== Policy work ==
In January 2020, the foundation published a white paper for the European Commission with recommendations on free and open-source silicon hardware. In November 2023, a roadmap for the development of open-source silicon in the European Union, prepared in the context of the EU-funded GoIT project, was presented to the European Commission; the work was highlighted by the Commission's CORDIS research-results service.

The foundation argues that the concentration of the EDA market in a small number of proprietary vendors, combined with non-public pricing and licence terms that restrict the publication of chip designs, creates barriers for small enterprises and researchers, and it advocates copyleft licensing for both EDA software and hardware designs.

== Hardware General Public License ==
The foundation is developing the Hardware General Public License (HGPL), a copyleft licence for silicon designs intended to be compatible with the GNU General Public License (GPL). The project is motivated by a documented gap in hardware licensing: the strongly reciprocal CERN Open Hardware Licence (CERN-OHL-S) is incompatible with the GPL, which the foundation argues risks fragmenting the free-hardware and free-software communities, since complex silicon designs frequently incorporate GPL-licensed code. A first public draft of the licence, prepared with the lawyer Panos Alevropoulos, was published as a request for comments in July 2026 and presented at FSiC 2026.

== Community activities ==
The foundation packages open-source EDA tools for the GNU Guix software distribution and maintains a directory of open-source EDA toolchains. Using a large language model, it analysed a 2025 dump of the OpenAIRE repository and extracted more than 13,000 academic theses related to chip design and EDA into a public, searchable database.

Members of the foundation have given talks on open-source silicon at venues including the Chaos Communication Congress (37C3), the South Tyrol Free Software Conference (SFSCON), TU Dresden, and the Sapienza University of Rome.

== See also ==
- Free and Open Source Silicon Foundation
- Open-source hardware
- Electronic design automation
- OpenROAD (software)
