= Caltech Intermediate Form =

EDA file format for integrated circuits

Caltech Intermediate Form(at)
- Filename extension: .cif
- Type of format: EDA file format

Caltech Intermediate Form (CIF) is a file format for describing integrated circuits. CIF provides a limited set of graphics primitives that are useful for describing the two-dimensional shapes on the different layers of a chip. The format allows hierarchical description, which makes the representation concise. In addition, it is a terse but human-readable text format.

CIF was created by Ivan Sutherland and Ron Ayres in 1976, with improvements by Carlo H. Séquin, Douglas Fairbairn and Stephen Trimberger. The written specification was later updated by Robert Sproull and Richard Lyon and revised by Stephen Trimberger.

== Overview ==
Each statement in CIF consists of a keyword or letter followed by parameters and terminated with a semicolon. Spaces must separate the parameters but there are no restrictions on the number of statements per line or of the particular columns of any field. Comments can be inserted anywhere by enclosing them in parentheses.

There are only a few CIF statements and they fall into one of two categories: geometry or control. The geometry statements are: LAYER to switch mask layers, BOX to draw a rectangle, WIRE to draw a path, ROUNDFLASH to draw a circle, POLYGON to draw an arbitrary figure, and CALL to draw a subroutine of other geometry statements. The control statements are DS to start the definition of a subroutine, DF to finish the definition of a subroutine, DD to delete the definition of subroutines, 0 through 9 to include additional user-specified information, and END to terminate a CIF file. All of these keywords are usually abbreviated to one or two letters that are unique.

== Geometry ==
The LAYER statement (or the letter L) sets the mask layer to be used for all subsequent geometry until the next such statement. Following the LAYER keyword comes a single layer-name parameter. For example, the command:

    L CC;

sets the layer to be the CMOS contact cut (see Fig. B.1 for some typical MOS layer names).

NM	nMOS metal
NP	nMOS polysilicon
ND	nMOS diffusion
NC	nMOS contact
NI	nMOS implant
NB	nMOS buried
NG	nMOS overglass
CMF	CMOS metal 1
CMS	CMOS metal 2
CPG	CMOS polysilicon
CAA	CMOS active
CSG	CMOS select
CWG	CMOS well
CC	CMOS contact
CVA	CMOS via
COG	CMOS overglass
FIGURE B.1 CIF layer names for MOS processes.

The BOX statement (or the letter B) is the most commonly used way of specifying geometry. It describes a rectangle by giving its length, width, center position, and an optional rotation. The format is as follows:

    B length width xpos ypos [rotation] ;

Without the rotation field, the four numbers specify a box the center of which is at (xpos, ypos) and is length across in x and width tall in y. All numbers in CIF are integers that refer to centimicrons of distance, unless subroutine scaling is specified (described later). The optional rotation field contains two numbers that define a vector endpoint starting at the origin. The default value of this field is (1, 0), which is a right-pointing vector. Thus the rotation clause 10 5 defines a 26.6-degree counterclockwise rotation from the normal. Similarly, 10 -10 will rotate clockwise by 45 degrees. Note that the magnitude of this rotation vector has no meaning.

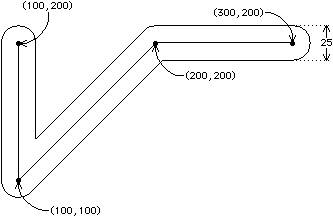
FIGURE B.2 A sample CIF "wire" statement. The statement is: W25 100 200 100 100 200 200 300 200;

The WIRE statement (or the letter W) is used to construct a path that runs between a set of points. The path can have a nonzero width and has rounded corners. After the WIRE keyword comes the width value and then an arbitrary number of coordinate pairs that describe the endpoints. Figure B.2 shows a sample wire. Note that the endpoint and corner rounding are implicitly handled.

The ROUNDFLASH statement (or the letter R) draws a filled circle, given the diameter and the center coordinate. For example, the statement:

    R 20 30 40;

will draw a circle that has a radius of 10 (diameter of 20), centered at (30, 40).

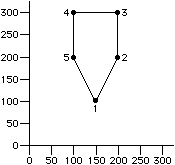
FIGURE B.3 A sample CIF "polygon" statement. The statement is: P 150 100 200 200 200 300 100 300 100 200;

The POLYGON statement (or the letter P) takes a series of coordinate pairs and draws a filled polygon from them. Since filled polygons must be closed, the first and last coordinate points are implicitly connected and need not be the same. Polygons can be arbitrarily complex, including concavity and self-intersection. Figure B.3 illustrates a polygon statement.

== Hierarchy ==
The CALL statement (or the letter C) invokes a collection of other statements that have been packaged with DS and DF. All subroutines are given numbers when they are defined and these numbers are used in the CALL to identify them. If, for example, a LAYER statement and a BOX statement are packaged into subroutine 4, then the statement:

    C 4;

will cause the box to be drawn on that layer.

In addition to simply invoking the subroutine, a CALL statement can include transformations to affect the geometry inside the subroutine. Three transformations can be applied to a subroutine in CIF: translation, rotation, and mirroring. Translation is specified as the letter T followed by an x, y offset. These offsets will be added to all coordinates in the subroutine, to translate its graphics across the mask. Rotation is specified as the letter R followed by an x, y vector endpoint that, much like the rotation clause in the BOX statement, defines a line to the origin. The unrotated line has the endpoint (1, 0), which points to the right. Mirroring is available in two forms: MX to mirror in x and MY to mirror in y. Mirroring is a bit confusing, because MX causes a negation of the x coordinate, which effectively mirrors about the y axis.

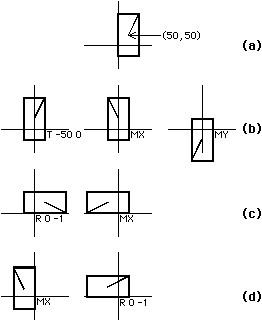
FIGURE B.4 The transformations of a CIF "call": (a) Subroutine 10: BOX 100 200 50 50; WIRE 10 50 50 100 150; (b) Invocation: C 10 T -50 0 MX MY; (c) Invocation: C 10 R 0 -1 MX; (d) Invocation: C 10 MX R 0 -1;

Any number of transformations can be applied to an object and their listed order is the sequence that will be used to apply them. Figure B.4 shows some examples, illustrating the importance of ordering the transformations (notice that Figs. B.4c and B.4d produce different results by rearranging the transformations).

Defining subroutines for use in a CALL statement is quite simple. The statements to be packaged are enclosed between DS (definition start) and DF (definition finish) statements. Arguments to the DS statement are the subroutine number and a subroutine scaling factor. There are no arguments to the DF statement. The scaling factor for a subroutine consists of a numerator followed by a denominator that will be applied to all values inside the subroutine. This scaling allows large numbers to be expressed with fewer digits and allows ease of rescaling a design. The scale factor cannot be changed for each invocation of the subroutine since it is applied to the definition. As an example, the subroutine of Fig. B.4 can be described formally as follows:

    DS 10 20 2;
      B10 20 5 5;
      W1 5 5 10 15;
    DF;

Note that the scale factor is 20/2, which allows the trailing zero to be dropped from all values inside the subroutine.

Arbitrary depth of hierarchy is allowed in CIF subroutines. Forward references are allowed provided that a subroutine is defined before it is used. Thus the sequence:

    DS 10;
       ...
      C 11;
    DF;
    DS 11;
       ...
    DF;
    C 10;

is legal, but the sequence:

    C 11;
    DS 11;
       ...

    DF;

is not. This is because the actual invocation of subroutine 11 does not occur until after its definition in the first example.

== Control ==
CIF subroutines can be overwritten by deleting them and then redefining them. The DD statement (delete definition) takes a single parameter and deletes every subroutine that has a number greater than or equal to this value. The statement is useful when merging multiple CIF files because designs can be defined, invoked, and deleted without causing naming conflicts. However, it is not recommended for general use by CAD systems.

Extensions to CIF can be done with the numeric statements 0 through 9. Although not officially part of CIF, certain conventions have evolved for the use of these extensions (see Fig. B.5).

0 x y layer N name;	Set named node on specified layer and position
0V x1 y1 x2 y2 ... xn yn;	Draw vectors
2A "msg" T x y;	Place message above specified location
2B "msg" T x y;	Place message below specified location
2C "msg" T x y;	Place message centered at specified location
2L "msg" T x y;	Place message left of specified location
2R "msg" T x y;	Place message right of specified location
4A lowx lowy highx highy;	Declare cell boundary
4B instancename;	Attach instance name to cell
4N signalname x y;	Labels a signal at a location
9 cellname;	Declare cell name
91 instancename;	Attach instance name to cell
94 label x y;	Place label in specified location
95 label length width x y;	Place label in specified area
FIGURE B.5 Typical user extensions to CIF.

The final statement in a CIF file is the END statement (or the letter E). It takes no parameters and typically does not include a semicolon.

=== BNF grammar ===
The following is the grammar for the CIF format with cifFile being the top level grammar node.

cifFile ::= (blank* command? semi)* endCommand blank*
command ::= primCommand | defDeleteCommand | defStartCommand semi (blank* primCommand? semi)* defFinishCommand
primCommand ::= polygonCommand | boxCommand | roundFlashCommand | wireCommand | layerCommand | callCommand | userExtensionCommand | commentCommand
polygonCommand ::= "P" path
boxCommand ::= "B" integer sep integer sep point (sep point)?
roundFlashCommand ::= "R" integer sep point
wireCommand ::= "W" integer sep path
layerCommand ::= "L" blank* shortname
defStartCommand ::= "D" blank* "S" integer (sep integer sep integer)?
defFinishCommand ::= "D" blank* "F"
defDeleteCommand ::= "D" blank* "D" integer
callCommand ::= "C" integer transformation
userExtensionCommand ::= digit userText
commentCommand ::= "(" commentText ")"
endCommand ::= "E"
transformation ::= (blank* ("T" point |"M" blank* "X" |"M" blank* "Y" |"R" point)*)*
path ::= point (sep point)*
point ::= sInteger sep sInteger
sInteger ::= sep* "-"? integerD
integer ::= sep* integerD
integerD ::= digit+
shortname ::= c c? c? c?
c ::= digit | upperChar
userText ::= userChar*
commentText ::= commentChar* | commentText "(" commentText ")" commentText
semi ::= blank* ";" blank*
sep ::= upperChar | blank
digit ::= "0" | "1" | ... | "9"
upperChar ::= "A" | "B" | ... | "Z"
blank ::= any ASCII character except digit, upperChar, "-", "(", ")", or ";"
userChar ::= any ASCII character except ";"
commentChar ::= any ASCII character except "(" or ")"

== See also ==
- GDS II stream format
- OASIS (Open Artwork System Interchange Standard)
- EDIF, a vendor neutral file format made in 90s
