= Faraday Technology =

Faraday Technology Corporation 智原科技股份有限公司
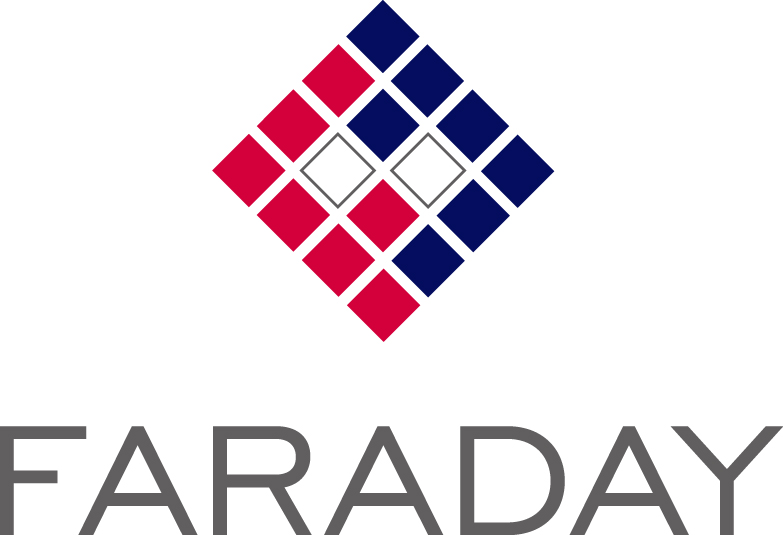
- Company type: Public Limited, TWSE: 3035
- Founded: 1993
- Headquarters: Hsinchu Science Park in Hsinchu, Taiwan
- Key people: Chairman: Stan Hung; President: Steve Wang
- Products: ASIC/SoC design service, Silicon intellectual properties, SIP
- Number of employees: 950
- Website: www.faraday-tech.com

Faraday Technology Corporation (Chinese: 智原科技股份有限公司; pinyin: Zhìyuán Kējì Gǔfèn Yǒuxiàn Gōngsī) is a fabless ASIC / SoC and silicon IP (intellectual property) provider. From specification level to GDSII-in, its flexible engagement model allows customers at various levels in the design phase to begin ASIC implementation.

Faraday's comprehensive IP portfolio and available IP customization service make ASIC implementation straightforward and allow the company to address a wide range of customer applications and market segments.

Since 1993, Faraday has established numerous alliances with leading worldwide semiconductor providers in IP, EDA, manufacturing, packaging, and testing which has allowed us to complete thousands of tapeouts resulting in hundreds of millions chips shipped worldwide a year.

== Overview ==
Faraday is a microchip design subsidiary of United Microelectronics Corporation.

Most of the firm's revenue comes from royalties on the chips it designed for customers.

== History ==
The company was founded in 1993 as a spinoff from United Microelectronics Corporation and is now the biggest silicon IP company in Taiwan.

Faraday is collaborating with Samsung on 14 nm chip technology.

== Offices ==
- Headquarter in Hsinchu, Taiwan
- Tokyo, Japan
- Shanghai, China
- Suzhou, China
- San Jose, California, USA
- Beaverton, Oregon, USA
- Bangalore, INDIA
- Ho Chi Minh, Vietnam

== See also ==
- List of companies of Taiwan
