= John Ousterhout =

American computer scientist

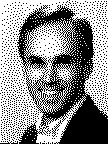
- Born: October 15, 1954 (age 71); Solano County, California, U.S.
- Education: Yale University (BS); Carnegie Mellon University (PhD)
- Known for: Tcl, Tk; Magic; Raft (algorithm)
- Awards: Grace Murray Hopper Award (1987); ACM Software System Award (1997)
- Scientific career
- Fields: Computer science
- Institutions: Stanford University
- Website: web.stanford.edu/~ouster/cgi-bin/home.php

John Kenneth Ousterhout (/ˈoʊstərhaʊt/, born October 15, 1954) is an American computer scientist. He is a professor of computer science at Stanford University. He founded Electric Cloud with John Graham-Cumming.

Ousterhout was previously a professor of computer science at University of California, Berkeley, where he created the Tcl scripting language and the Tk platform-independent widget toolkit, and proposed the idea of coscheduling. Ousterhout led the research group that designed the experimental Sprite operating system and the first log-structured file system. Ousterhout also led the team that developed the Magic VLSI computer-aided design (CAD) program.

== Education and career ==
He received a Bachelor of Science (B.S.) in physics from Yale University in 1975, and his Ph.D. in computer science from Carnegie Mellon University in 1980.

Ousterhout received the Grace Murray Hopper Award in 1987 for his work on electronic design automation CAD systems for very-large-scale integrated circuits. For the same work, he was inducted in 1994 as a Fellow of the Association for Computing Machinery. Ousterhout was elected a member of the National Academy of Engineering in 2001 for improving our ability to program computers by raising the level of abstraction.

In 1994, Ousterhout left Berkeley to join Sun Microsystems Laboratories, which hired a team to join him in Tcl development. After several years at Sun, he left and co-founded Scriptics, Inc. (later renamed Ajuba Solutions) in January 1998 to provide professional Tcl development tools. Most of the Tcl team followed him from Sun. Ajuba was purchased by Interwoven in October 2000. He joined the faculty of Stanford University in 2008.

== Selected works ==
- Michael Stonebraker; Randy Katz, David Patterson, John Ousterhout (1988). "THE DESIGN OF XPRS" (PDF). VLDB: 318–330. Archived (PDF) from the original on 2022-10-09.
- A Philosophy of Software Design, (Yaknyam Press, 2018, ISBN 1732102201)

== See also ==
- Ousterhout's dichotomy
- Raft (computer science)
