= Dolphin Semiconductor =

French semiconductor design company

- Industry: Semiconductors
- Predecessor: Power management and signal processing IP activities of Dolphin Design
- Founded: 2024; 2 years ago
- Headquarters: Meylan, France
- Number of locations: Meylan, France; St. Laurent, Montreal, Quebec, Canada
- Area served: International
- Owner: Jolt Capital, Vertex
- Number of employees: 160, including 130 engineers
- Website: dolphin-semiconductor.com

Dolphin Semiconductor is a French-based semiconductor company specializing in low-power mixed-signal intellectual property (IP) solutions. The company designs IP blocks for applications across consumer electronics, automotive, industrial IoT, and high-performance computing (HPC).

Dolphin Semiconductor was established in November 2024 following an acquisition by Jolt Capital, a private equity firm focused on deep-tech investments. Jolt Capital acquired the mixed-signal IP activities of Dolphin Design (formerly Dolphin Integration), investing €26 million to create Dolphin Semiconductor as an independent entity.

The company, led by CEO Laurent Monge, has offices in Meylan (France) at the heart of the French Silicon Valley and in Montreal, Canada.

== History ==
Dolphin Integration was founded in 1985 with a dedication to design services to the Integrated Device Makers (IDM) in the wake of deverticalization of this industry. In 2019, the company was renamed to Dolphin Design.

In November 2024, Jolt Capital acquired the power management and signal processing intellectual property activities of Dolphin Design, incorporating them into a new company, Dolphin Semiconductor, with the mission of developing complex analog, digital, and mixed-signal IPs for design companies. Dolphin Semiconductor is based in Meylan in the Grenoble region. It also has R&D offices in Montreal, Canada.

Since then, the catalog has evolved to include IPs for ultra-low-power management, audio.

== Activities ==
Dolphin Semiconductor’s offerings center around power management and audio IP solutions. Major product categories include:

- Power Management IP: DC/DC converters, Low Dropout (LDO) regulators, SIMO and other relevant voltage regulators IP
- Audio Processing IP: Analog-to-Digital Converters (ADCs), Digital-to-Analog Converters (DACs), audio codecs classA/B+D, Voice Activity Detection (VAD) and Neuromorphic Audio front-end technology.
- Timing Monitors and sensors: fully-digital in-situ system compensation, low-power Power-On Reset (POR) and Brown-Out Reset (BOR) monitors
- Oscillator IP: Ultra-low power oscillators.

== Market and competition ==
Dolphin Semiconductor’s IP solutions cater to several industries

1. Automotive: automotive infotainment and other systems.
2. Industrial and Internet of Things: industrial automation, IoT, and connected devices.
3. Consumer Electronics: devices such as smartphones, wearables, and tablets.
4. High-Performance Computing (HPC): data centers and AI applications

It collaborates with foundries companies such as: TSMC, GlobalFoundries, SMIC, Samsung, to develop its products.
