= ZPU (processor) =

Microprocessor stack machine

The ZPU is a microprocessor stack machine designed by Norwegian company Zylin AS to run supervisory code in electronic systems that include a field-programmable gate array (FPGA).

It has been designed to require very small amounts of electronic logic, making more electronic logic available for other purposes in the FPGA. To make it easily usable, it has a port of the GNU Compiler Collection. This makes it much easier to apply than CPUs without compilers. Sacrificing speed in exchange for small size, it keeps the intermediate results of calculations in memory, in a push-down stack, rather than in registers.

Zylin Corp. made the ZPU open-source in 2008.

== Usage ==
Many electronic projects include electronic logic in an FPGA. It is wasteful to also have a microprocessor, so it is commonplace to add a CPU to the electronic logic in the FPGA. Often, a smaller, less-expensive FPGA could be used if only the CPU used less resources. This is the exact situation that the ZPU was designed to address.

The ZPU is designed to handle the miscellaneous tasks of a system that are best handled by software, for example, a user interface. The ZPU is very slow, but its small size helps to place any needed high-speed algorithm in the FPGA.

Another issue is that most CPUs for FPGAs are closed-source, available only from a particular maker of FPGAs. Occasionally a project needs to have a design that can be widely distributed, for security inspections, educational uses or other reasons. The licenses on these proprietary CPUs can prevent these uses. The ZPU is open-sourced.

Some projects need code that must be small, but run on a CPU that inherently has larger code. Alternatively, a project may benefit from the wide selection of code, compilers and debugging tools for the GNU Compiler Collection. In these cases, an emulator can be written to implement the ZPU's instruction set on the target CPU, and the ZPU's compilers can be used to produce the code. The resulting system is slow, but packs code into less memory than many CPUs and enables the project to use a wide variety of compilers and code.

== Design features ==
The ZPU was designed explicitly to minimize the amount of electronic logic. It has a minimal instruction set, yet can be encoded for the GNU Compiler Collection. It also minimizes the number of registers that must be in the FPGA, minimizing the number of flip-flops. Instead of registers, intermediate results are kept on the stack, in memory.

It also has small code, saving on memory. Stack machine instructions do not need to contain register IDs, so the ZPU's code is smaller than other RISC CPUs, said to need only about 80% of the space of ARM Holdings Thumb2. For example, the signed immediate helps the ZPU store a 32-bit value in at most 5 bytes of instruction space, and as little as one. Most RISC CPUs require at least eight bytes.

Finally, about 2/3 of its instructions can be emulated by firmware implemented using the other 1/3 "required" instructions. Although the result is very slow, the resulting CPU can require as little as 446 lookup-tables (a measure of FPGA complexity, roughly equivalent to 1700 electronic logic gates).

The ZPU has a reset vector, consisting of 32-bytes of code space starting at location zero. It also has a single edge-sensitive interrupt, with a vector consisting of 32 bytes of code space beginning at address 32. Vectors 2 through 63 each have 32 bytes of space, but are reserved for code to emulate instructions 33 through 63.

The base ZPU has a 32-bit data path. The ZPU also has a variant with a 16-bit-wide data path, to save even more logic.

== Tools and resources ==
The ZPU has a well-tested port of the GNU Compiler Collection. Enthusiasts and firmware engineers have ported ECos, FreeRTOS and μClinux. At least one group of enthusiasts have copied the popular development environment of the Arduino and adapted it to the ZPU.

There are now multiple models of the ZPU core. Besides the original Zylin cores, there are also the ZPUino cores, and the ZPUFlex core. The Zylin core is designed for a minimal FPGA footprint, and includes a 16-bit version. The ZPUino has practical improvements for speed, can replace emulated instructions with hardware, and is embedded in a system-on-chip framework. The ZPUFlex is designed to use external memory blocks and can replace emulated instructions with hardware.

Academic projects include power efficiency studies and improvements, and reliability studies.

To improve speed, most implementors have implemented the emulated instructions, and added a stack cache. Beyond this, one implementor said that a two-stack architecture would permit pipelining (i.e. improving speed to one instruction per clock cycle), but this might also require compiler changes.

One implementor reduced power usage by 46% with a stack cache and automated insertion of clock gating. The power usage was then roughly equivalent to the small open-source Amber core, which implements the ARM v2a architecture.

The parts of the ZPU that would be most aided by fault-tolerance are the address bus, stack pointer and program counter.

== Instruction set ==
"TOS" is an abbreviation of the "Top Of Stack." "NOS" is an abbreviation of the "Next to the top Of Stack."

Required ZPU Instruction Set
Name	Binary	Description
BREAKPOINT	00000000	Halt the CPU and/or jump to the debugger.
IM_x	1xxxxxxx	Push or append a signed 7-bit immediate to the TOS.
STORESP_x	010xxxxx	Pop the TOS and store it into the stack at an offset from the top.
LOADSP_x	011xxxxx	Fetch from a value indexed in the stack and push it into the TOS.
EMULATE_x	001xxxxx	Emulate an instruction with code at vector x (ie. jump to address x * 32).
ADDSP_x	0001xxxx	Fetch from a value indexed in the stack and add the value to the TOS.
POPPC	00000100	Pop an address from the TOS and store it to the PC.
LOAD	00001000	Pop an address and push the loaded memory value to the TOS.
STORE	00001100	Store the NOS into the memory pointed-to by the TOS. Pop both.
PUSHSP	00000010	Push the current SP into the TOS.
POPSP	00001101	Pop the TOS and store it to the SP.
ADD	00000101	Integer addition of TOS and NOS.
AND	00000110	Bitwise AND of the TOS and NOS.
OR	00000111	Bitwise OR of the TOS and NOS.
NOT	00001001	Bitwise NOT of the TOS.
FLIP	00001010	Reverse the bit order of the TOS.
NOP	00001011	No-Operation. (Usually used for delay loops or tables of code.)

Opcodes 34 to 63 may be emulated by code in vectors 2 through 32: LOADH and STOREH (16-bit memory access), LESSTHAN (comparisons set 1 for true, 0 for false), LESSTHANOREQUAL, ULESSTHAN, ULESSTHANOREQUAL, SWAP (TOS with NOS), MULT, LSHIFTRIGHT, ASHIFTLEFT, ASHIFTRIGHT, CALL, EQ, NEQ, NEG, SUB, XOR, LOADB and STOREB (8-bit memory access), DIV, MOD, EQBRANCH, NEQBRANCH, POPPCREL, CONFIG, PUSHPC, SYSCALL, PUSHSPADD, HALFMULT, CALLPCREL

Optional (emulated) Instructions
Name	Binary	Description
LOADH	00100010	Load short
STOREH	00100011	Store short
LESSTHAN	00100100	Signed less-than comparison
LESSTHANOREQUAL	00100101	Signed less-than-or-equal comparison
ULESSTHAN	00100110	Unsigned less-than comparison
ULESSTHANOREQUAL	00100111	Unsigned less-than-or-equal comparison
SWAP	00101000	Swap TOS and NOS
MULT	00101001	Signed 32-bit multiplication
LSHIFTRIGHT	00101010	Logical shift right
ASHIFTLEFT	00101011	Arithmetic shift left
ASHIFTRIGHT	00101100	Arithmetic shift right
CALL	00101101	Call function
EQ	00101110	Comparison equal
NEQ	00101111	Comparison not equal
NEG	00110000	Negative
SUB	00110001	Subtract
XOR	00110010	Exclusive-OR
LOADB	00110011	Load byte
STOREB	00110100	Store byte
DIV	00110101	Signed 32-bit division
MOD	00110110	Signed 32-bit modulus
EQBRANCH	00110111	Branch if equal
NEQBRANCH	00111000	Branch if not equal
POPPCREL	00111001	Pop PC relative
CONFIG	00111010	Internal configuration
PUSHPC	00111011	Push current PC
SYSCALL	00111100	System Call
PUSHSPADD	00111101	Push SP + offset
HALFMULT	00111110	
CALLPCREL	00111111	Call relative function
