= Open Artwork System Interchange Standard =

File format used for photomask production

OASIS
- Developed by: SEMI
- Initial release: September 2002; 23 years ago
- Standards: SEMI P39-0416
- Open format?: Yes
- Free format?: No
- Website: SEMI SEMI P39 - Specification for OASIS (P39-0416)

Open Artwork System Interchange Standard (OASIS) is a binary file format used for specification of data structures for photomask production. It's used to represent a pattern an interchange and encapsulation format for hierarchical integrated circuit mask layout information produced during integrated circuit design that is further used for manufacturing of a photomask. The standard is developed by SEMI. The language defines the code required for geometric shapes such as rectangles, trapezoids, and polygons. It defines the type of properties each can have, how they can be organized into cells containing patterns made by these shapes and defines how each can be placed relative to each other. It is similar to GDSII.

As of 2023 the cost of the standard for members of SEMI was set to $252 and non-members: US$335.

== Introduction ==
OASIS is the purported commercial successor to the integrated circuit design and manufacturing electronic pattern layout language, GDSII.

GDSII was created in the 1970s when integrated circuit designs had a few hundred thousand geometric shapes, properties and placements to manage. Today, there can be billions of shapes, properties, and placements to manage. File sizes of GDSII format often takes tens of gigabytes of storage and are difficult to store and process. OASIS creators and users claimed that the growth of workstations' data storage and handling capabilities was far outpaced by the growth of Integrated Circuit layout complexity. Therefore, OASIS tries to solve the purported problem of the large size of the GDSII files by introducing complicated types of the geometric shapes (25 types of trapezoids only) to reduce the data size. Also, variable-length numeric format (similar to Run-length encoding) for coordinates was implemented. Finally, each cell in the OASIS file can be independently compressed by the gzip-like algorithm.

The effort to create the OASIS format started in June 2001. The release of version 1.0 took place in March 2004. Its use required the development of new OASIS readers and writers that could be coupled to design and manufacturing equipment already equipped with GDSII readers and writers. Its adoption was born of a concerted effort by integrated circuit design, equipment, photomask, fabless, 3rd party Intellectual Property (IP) and manufacturing companies from the United States, Japan, Taiwan, Korea and Europe.

A constrained version of OASIS, called OASIS.MASK, addresses the unique needs of semiconductor photomask manufacturing equipment such as pattern generators and inspection systems. Both OASIS and OASIS.MASK are industry standards.

== Example datafile ==
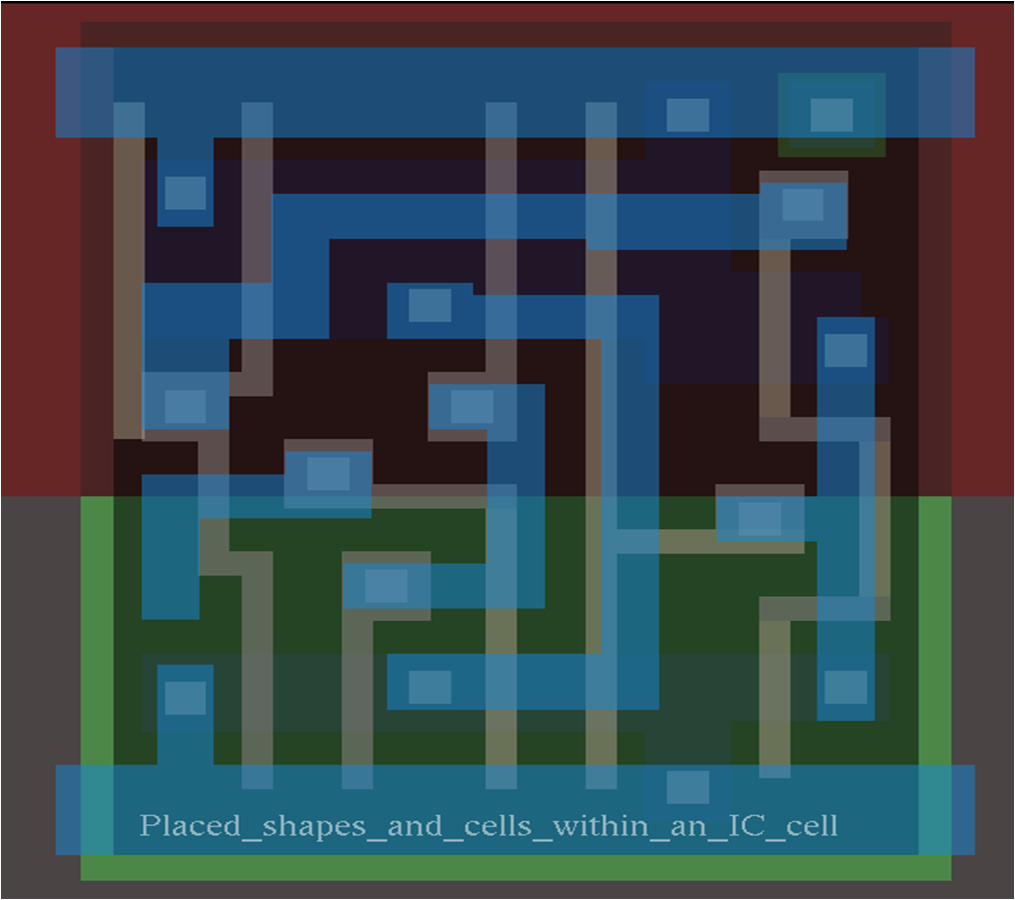
This view is called a cell view. A cell can be a collection of placed geometric shapes. It also can be a collection of cells; each containing other cells and/or geometric shapes. Each cell must have at least one layer. In this view, each color represents a different layer within the cell. An integrated circuit can contain tens of thousands of unique cells and repeated instances of the same cell.

Below is a human-readable text representation of the OASIS binary file that allowed the expression of the above "top" cell view called "Placed_shapes_and_cells_within_an_IC_cell". The top cell is defined by a file-level standard PROPERTY record named S_TOP_CELL. The PROPERTY record below references a PROPNAME record (refNum=0) that has a propname-string called S_TOP_CELL. The top cell contains the placement of three cells called "bottom cells". Bottom cells contain geometric shapes only.

Each line of the OASIS representation below contains (from the left) a record number and a record type followed by a set of values that define that record type. For instance, the first RECTANGLE record below defines the following type of rectangle shape, its size and its absolute location:

- Layer
- Datatype
- Width
- Height
- Lower-left x-coordinate
- Lower-left y-coordinate

Absent in this RECTANGLE record is an option to describe the locations of repeated instances of the rectangle. Also, this record type allows the description of a square by defining the value for the width only. To enable these descriptions, one must set what is referred to as the bit pattern for the RECTANGLE record. For a RECTANGLE record, the bit pattern (either a 1 (enabled) or a 0 (disabled)) is:

SWHXYRDL (Square,Width,Height,X-coordinate,Y-coordinate,Repetition,Datatype,Layer-number).

For this RECTANGLE record, the bit pattern is set to 0WHXY0DL (Not a square,Width,Height,X-coordinate,Y-coordinate,Not repetitive,Datatype,Layer-number). The first and second RECTANGLE records in cell "Cell_Placed_Shapes_2" (CELL refNum=1)" define repeated instances of a rectangle. The first RECTANGLE record (SW0XYRDL) uses a type 10 repetition (rep=rep10). The second RECTANGLE record (0WHXYR0L) uses a type 11 repetition (rep=Rep11). There are a total of eleven repetition types (Rep1-Rep11). In the second RECTANGLE record bit pattern, the datatype(D) was set to '0' because the same datatype used in the first RECTANGLE record applies to the second RECTANGLE record. Other OASIS-supported geometric shapes having the record types POLYGON, TRAPEZOID, CTRAPEZOID, CIRCLE and PATH are defined by different bit patterns.

According to the CELLNAME records below, the bottom cells have the following cellname-strings "Cell_Placed_Shapes_1, . . . _2 and . . . _3". Each layer-number that had been assigned to a geometric shape has an association with a LAYERNAME record that defines a layer-interval and a layername-string. In this view, the layername-string, "Layer_Color_Mapping", defines the layer intervals used in a layer color table "layercolormap.data".

The example below was not meant to be an exhaustive description of the OASIS language. The objective was to give the interested reader a general understanding of the scope of the OASIS language and how it applies to the representation and the expression of the electronic layout patterns that define an integrated circuit.

- MAGIC "%SEMI-OASIS\015\012
1 START version="1.0" unit=real0(1000) offsetFlag=0 offsets=[(0,0) (0,0) (0,0) (0,0) (0,0) (0,0)]
28 PROPERTY 00010CNS refNum=0 count=(1) string12("Placed_shapes_and_cells_within_an_IC_cell")
7 PROPNAME name="S_TOP_CELL" refNum=(0)
3 CELLNAME name="Cell_Placed_Shapes_1" refNum=(0)
3 CELLNAME name="Cell_Placed_Shapes_2" refNum=(1)
3 CELLNAME name="Cell_Placed_Shapes_3" refNum=(2)
3 CELLNAME name="Placed_shapes_and_cells_within_an_IC_cell" refNum=(3)
11 LAYERNAME name="Layer_Color_Mapping" layers=3(25:25) datatypes=1(0:0)
11 LAYERNAME name="Layer_Color_Mapping" layers=4(41:46) datatypes=1(0:0)
11 LAYERNAME name="Layer_Color_Mapping" layers=3(49:49) datatypes=1(0:0)
11 LAYERNAME name="Layer_Color_Mapping" layers=3(63:63) datatypes=1(0:0)
13 CELL refNum=3
17 PLACEMENT CNXY0000 refNum=0 x=0 y=0
17 PLACEMENT CNXY0000 refNum=1 x=0 y=0
17 PLACEMENT CNXY0000 refNum=2 x=0 y=0
13 CELL refNum=0
20 RECTANGLE 0WHXY0DL layer=41 datatype=1 width=3960 height=1980 x=-440 y=-220
20 RECTANGLE 00H0Y00L layer=42 height=2420 y=1760
20 RECTANGLE 0WHXY00L layer=63 width=3080 height=3960 x=0 y=0
20 RECTANGLE 0WHXY00L layer=43 width=2255 height=55 x=110 y=605
20 RECTANGLE 0WH0Y000 width=2860 height=330 y=660
20 RECTANGLE 00H0Y000 height=110 y=2530
20 RECTANGLE 0WH0Y000 width=2750 height=220 y=2640
20 RECTANGLE 0WH0Y000 width=2255 height=550 y=2860
20 RECTANGLE 0WHXY000 width=330 height=440 x=2035 y=165
20 RECTANGLE 0WH0Y000 width=935 height=220 y=2310
20 RECTANGLE 0WH0Y000 width=330 height=385 y=3410
20 RECTANGLE S00XY000 x=2585 y=3465
20 RECTANGLE 0WHXY00L layer=44 width=3330 height=1665 x=-125 y=1760
20 RECTANGLE 0WH0Y000 width=2670 height=410 y=3425
20 RECTANGLE 0WH0Y000 width=3330 height=250 y=3835
20 RECTANGLE 0WHXY000 width=250 height=410 x=2955 y=3425
20 RECTANGLE 0WHXY00L layer=45 width=3330 height=1885 x=-125 y=-125
20 RECTANGLE SW0XY000 width=410 x=2545 y=3425
13 CELL refNum=1
20 RECTANGLE SW0XYRDL layer=25 datatype=0 width=160 x=195 y=690 rep=rep10[dim=15 disp=(g(0,1430) g(0,1045) g(550,-1375) g(220,-550) g(165,-495) g(0,1870) g(165,-495) g(825,-1870) g(0,3300) g(275,-1980) g(165,1540) g(110,440) g(55,-2805) g(0,1650))]
20 RECTANGLE 0WHXYR0L layer=46 width=340 height=220 x=105 y=2030 rep=rep11[dim=3 grid=10 disp=(g(55,-21) g(165,-22))]
20 RECTANGLE 0WH0YR00 width=505 height=120 y=2250 rep=rep10[dim=3 disp=(g(2365,-1100) g(0,880))]
20 RECTANGLE 0W0XY000 width=285 x=325 y=1370
20 RECTANGLE 0WH0Y000 width=120 height=540 y=1490
20 RECTANGLE 00HXY000 height=1045 x=490 y=325
20 RECTANGLE 00H0YR00 height=1320 y=2370 rep=rep2[xdim=2 dx=935]
20 RECTANGLE 0WHXY000 width=890 height=120 x=655 y=1700
20 RECTANGLE 0WHXY000 width=120 height=825 x=875 y=325
20 RECTANGLE SW00YR00 width=340 y=1150 rep=rep10[dim=3 disp=(g(330,880) g(1265,990))]
2 END

== Industry standard ==
OASIS and OASIS.MASK are now formal industry standards. Both are owned and maintained by the trade and standards organization SEMI. SEMI serves the semiconductor materials and equipment industries worldwide.

The fee-based specifications for SEMI P39 OASIS and SEMI P44 OASIS.MASK can be downloaded from SEMI's web-site.

== See also ==
- OpenAccess
