= S3 Group =

Irish software company

- Type: Private
- Industry: Digital health, connected medical devices
- Founded: 1986
- Headquarters: Dublin, Ireland
- Number of employees: 200 (2018)
- Website: www.s3group.com

S3 Group is a technology company that has provided software products to operators, OEM's, semiconductors and healthcare providers.Founded in 1986 as Silicon & Software Systems (S3),

In 2015, the group's "S3 TV Technology" business unit was sold to Accenture, and in 2018, the "S3 Semiconductors" division sold to Adesto Technologies. The remaining "S3 Connected Health" unit had, as of 2018, approximately 200 employees.
