= ERC32 =

General information
- Designed by: Sun Microsystems (original design, no involvement); Temic

Architecture and classification
- Instruction set: SPARC V7

History
- Successor: LEON

ERC32 is a radiation-tolerant 32-bit RISC processor (SPARC V7 specification) developed for space applications. It was developed by Temic, which was later acquired by Atmel, and then Microchip.

It is used in the DMS-R (Data Management System - Russian) computer on Zvezda module of the Russian Orbital Segment on the International Space Station (ISS). It is also used in the control, mission and failure management systems in the Russian segment, as well as the fault-tolerant systems of the Automated Transfer Vehicle and standard payload computer of the wider ISS.

== Versions ==
Two versions have been manufactured:

- ERC32 Chip Set (Part Names: TSC691, TSC692, TSC693)
- ERC32 Single Chip (Part Name: TSC695, TSC695F)

== Support ==
Support for the chip set version of the ERC32 has been discontinued. ERC32 was succeeded by LEON (SPARC V8 specification).
