= GNU toolchain =

Collection of programming tools produced by the GNU Project

The GNU toolchain is a broad collection of programming tools produced by the GNU Project. These tools form a toolchain (a suite of tools used in a serial manner) used for developing software applications and operating systems.

The GNU toolchain plays a vital role in development of Linux, some BSD systems, and software for embedded systems. Parts of the GNU toolchain are also directly used with or ported to other platforms such as Solaris, macOS, Microsoft Windows (via Cygwin and MinGW/MSYS/WSL2), Sony PlayStation Portable (used by PSP modding scene) and Sony PlayStation 3.

== Components ==
Projects in the GNU toolchain are:

- GNU Autotools (build system) – Software build toolset from GNU
- GNU Binutils – GNU software development tools for executable code
- GNU Bison – Yacc-compatible parser generator program
- GNU C Library – GNU implementation of the standard C library
- GNU Compiler Collection – Free and open-source compiler for various programming languages
- GNU Debugger – Source-level debugger
- GNU m4 – General-purpose macro processor
- GNU make – Software build automation tool

== See also ==
- CVS – Historical centralized version control system
- Cross compiler – Cross-platform machine-code compiler
- Cygwin – Unix-like environment for Windows
- Git – Distributed version control software system
- GNU Classpath – Implementation of standard class library of Java
- GNU Core Utilities – Package of software containing basic utilities used on Unix-like operating systems
- LLVM – Compiler backend for multiple programming languages
- MinGW – Free and open-source software for developing applications in Microsoft Windows
