= OpenCores =

Open-source hardware community

OpenCores is a community developing digital open-source hardware through electronic design automation (EDA), with a similar ethos to the free software movement. OpenCores hopes to eliminate redundant design work and significantly reduce development costs. A number of companies have been reported as adopting OpenCores IP in chips, or as adjuncts to EDA tools. OpenCores is also sometimes cited as an example of open source in the electronics hardware community.

OpenCores has always been a commercially owned organization. In 2015, its core active users established the independent Free and Open Source Silicon Foundation (FOSSi Foundation), and created another directory on the librecores.org website as the basis for all future development, independent of commercial control. It has been shut down to redirect to a post on the FOSSi Foundation website seven years later in favor of a simple web search, reasoning that "free and open source silicon is no longer a dream".

== History ==
Damjan Lampret, one of the founders of OpenCores, stated on his website that it began in 1999. The new website and its objectives were reported publicly by EE Times in 2000 and CNET News in 2001. Through the following years it was supported by advertising and sponsorship, including by Flextronics.

In mid-2007 an appeal was put out for a new backer. That November, Swedish design house ORSoC AB agreed to take over maintenance of the OpenCores website.

EE Times reported in late 2008 that OpenCores had passed the 20,000 subscriber mark. In October 2010 it reached 95,000 registered users and had approximately 800 projects. In July 2012 it reached 150,000 registered users.

During 2015, ORSoC AB formed a joint venture with KNCMiner AB to develop bitcoin mining machines. As this became the primary focus of the business, they were able to spend less time with the opencores.org project. In response to the growing lack of commitment, the core OpenRISC development team set up the Free and Open Source Silicon Foundation (FOSSi), and registered the librecores.org website as the basis for all future development, independent of commercial control.

== Licensing ==
In the absence of a widely accepted open source hardware license, the components produced by the OpenCores initiative use several different software licenses. The most common is the GNU LGPL, which states that any modifications to a component must be shared with the community, while one can still use it together with proprietary components. The less restrictive 3-clause BSD license is also used in some hardware projects, while the GNU GPL is often used for software components, such as models and firmware.

== The OpenCores library ==
The library will consist of design elements from central processing units, memory controllers, peripherals, motherboards, and other components. Emerging semiconductor manufacturers could use the information and license designs for free.

The emphasis is on digital modules called "cores", commonly known as IP Cores. The components are used for creating both custom integrated circuits (ASICs) and FPGAs.

The cores are implemented in the hardware description languages Verilog, VHDL or SystemC, which may be synthesized to either silicon or gate arrays.

The project aims at using a common non-proprietary system bus named Wishbone, and most components are nowadays adapted to this bus.

Among the components created by OpenCores contributors are:

- OpenRISC – a highly configurable RISC central processing unit
- Amber (processor core) – an ARM-compatible RISC central processing unit
- A Zilog Z80 clone
- USB 2.0 controller
- Tri Ethernet controller, 10/100/1000 Mbit
- Encryption units, for example DES, AES and RSA
- HyperTransport Tunnel
- A PIC16F84 core
- Zet – an x86 compatible core

== OpenRISC ASIC ==
In April 2011 OpenCores opened donations for a new project to develop a complete system on a chip design based on the OpenRISC processor and implement it into an ASIC-component. OpenCores affiliated with OpenCores, for example OpenSPARC and LEON.

== See also ==
- Free and Open Source Silicon Foundation
- Free content
- Open content
- Open-source hardware
- Wishbone
