= Free and Open Source Silicon Foundation =

UK non-profit foundation

FOSSi Foundation
- Founded: 2015; 11 years ago
- Type: Community Interest Company
- Purpose: Open Source Hardware
- Location: Halifax, United Kingdom
- Origins: OpenRISC community
- Region served: Worldwide
- Method: Promote and assist free and open digital hardware designs and their related ecosystems
- Website: https://www.fossi-foundation.org

The FOSSi Foundation (short for Free and Open Source Silicon Foundation) is a non-profit foundation with the mission to promote and protect the open source silicon chip movement. It was set up by the core OpenRISC development team in response to decreasing support from the commercial owners of the opencores.org website. It is established as a community interest company in the United Kingdom.

Since inception, FOSSi Foundation has supported the community with various activities.

== Events ==
FOSSi Foundation was founded at ORConf, which was originally the OpenRISC conference that started in 2011. ORConf has grown from a small developer meeting to the leading event on open source silicon, each year visiting another city in Europe.

To reach larger audiences, the sister event Latch-Up was established in North America in 2019.

== Project Support ==
FOSSi Foundation does not develop open source projects, but supports them with operational, technical and legal support. Prominent examples of projects that are supported by FOSSi Foundation are cocotb, LibreLane and Embench.

== Advocacy and Public Policy ==
FOSSi Foundation supports the community with advocacy targeted at the broader public, industry and public bodies. In particular it hosts and supports open letters, coordinated a roadmap on open source EDA, and hosts the Open Design Environment for European Chips initiative.

== History ==
During 2015, ORSoC AB, commercial owners of opencores.org formed a joint venture with KNCMiner AB to develop bitcoin mining machines. As this became the primary focus of the business, they spent less time on the opencores.org project. In response to the growing lack of commitment, the core OpenRISC development team set up the Free and Open Source Silicon Foundation (FOSSi), and registered the LibreCores website, as the basis for all future development, independent of commercial control.

In 2016, the LibreCores development intensified and the annual "LibreCores Student Design Contest" was announced The FOSSi Foundation is an umbrella organization in the Google Summer of Code 2016–2020.

== See also ==
- Open content
- Free content
- OpenCores
- Open-source hardware
