= List of microcontrollers =

This is a list of microcontrollers, organized by brand.

== Altera ==
In 2015, Altera was acquired by Intel, and then spun back out on its own in 2024.

- Nios II 32-bit configurable soft microprocessor
- Nios 16-bit configurable soft processor

== Analog Devices ==
- Blackfin
- Super Harvard Architecture Single-Chip Computer (SHARC)
- TigerSHARC
- ADSP-21xx digital signal processor
- MicroConverter Family – ARM7 and 8051 cores

== ARM ==
While Arm is a fabless semiconductor company (it does not manufacture or sell its own chips), it licenses the ARM architecture family design to a variety of companies. Those companies in turn sell billions of ARM-based chips per year—12 billion ARM-based chips shipped in 2014, about 24 billion ARM-based chips shipped in 2020, some of those are popular chips in their own right.

== Atmel ==
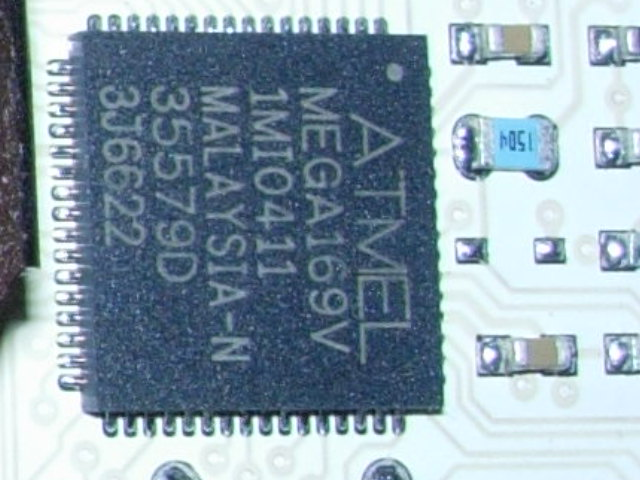
Atmel ATmega169 (64-pin MLF)

In 2016, Atmel was sold to Microchip Technology.

- AT89 series (Intel 8051 architecture)
- AT90, ATtiny, ATmega, ATxmega series (AVR architecture) (Atmel Norway design)
- AT91SAM (ARM architecture)
- AVR32 (32-bit AVR architecture) (Atmel Norway design)
- MARC4

== Cypress Semiconductor ==
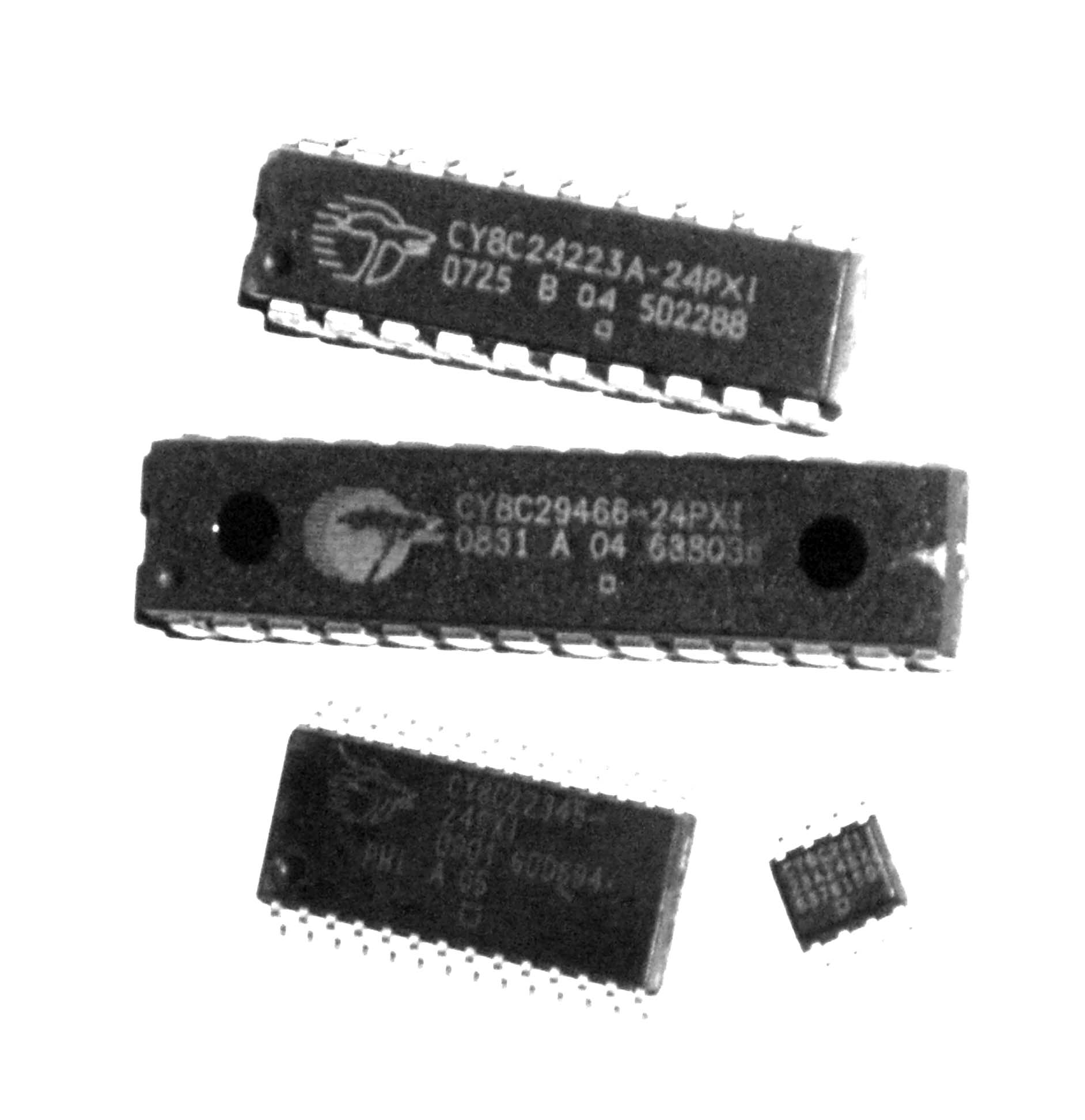
Cypress PSoC chips

In 2020, Cypress Semiconductor was acquired by Infineon Technologies.

- CY8C2xxxx (PSoC1), M8C
- CY8C3xxxx (PSoC3), 8051
- CY8C4xxxx (PSoC4), ARM Cortex-M0
- CY8C5xxxx (PSoC5), ARM Cortex-M3
- PSoC (Programmable System on Chip)

== ELAN Microelectronics Corp. ==
ELAN Microelectronics Corporation is an IC designer and provider of 8-bit microcontrollers and PC Peripheral ICs. Headquartered in Hsinchu Science Park, the Silicon Valley of Taiwan, ELAN's microcontroller product range includes the following:

- EM78PXXX Low Pin-Count MCU Family
- EM78PXXX GPIO Type MCU Family
- EM78PXXXN ADC Type MCU Family

These are clones of the 12- and 14-bit Microchip PIC line of processors, but with a 13-bit instruction word.

== EPSON Semiconductor ==
- 4-bit
  - S1C6x family
- 8-bit
  - S1C88 family
- 16-bit
  - S1C17 family
- 32-bit
  - S1C33 family

== Espressif Systems ==
Espressif Systems, a company with headquarters in Shanghai, China made its debut in the microcontroller scene with their range of inexpensive and feature-packed WiFi microcontrollers such as ESP8266.

- 32-bit
  - ESP8266
  - ESP32 Xtensa variants
    - ESP32, ESP32-S2, ESP32-S3 SoCs
  - ESP32 RISC-V variants
    - ESP32C2, ESP32C3, ESP32C6, ESP32H2 SoCs

== Freescale Semiconductor ==
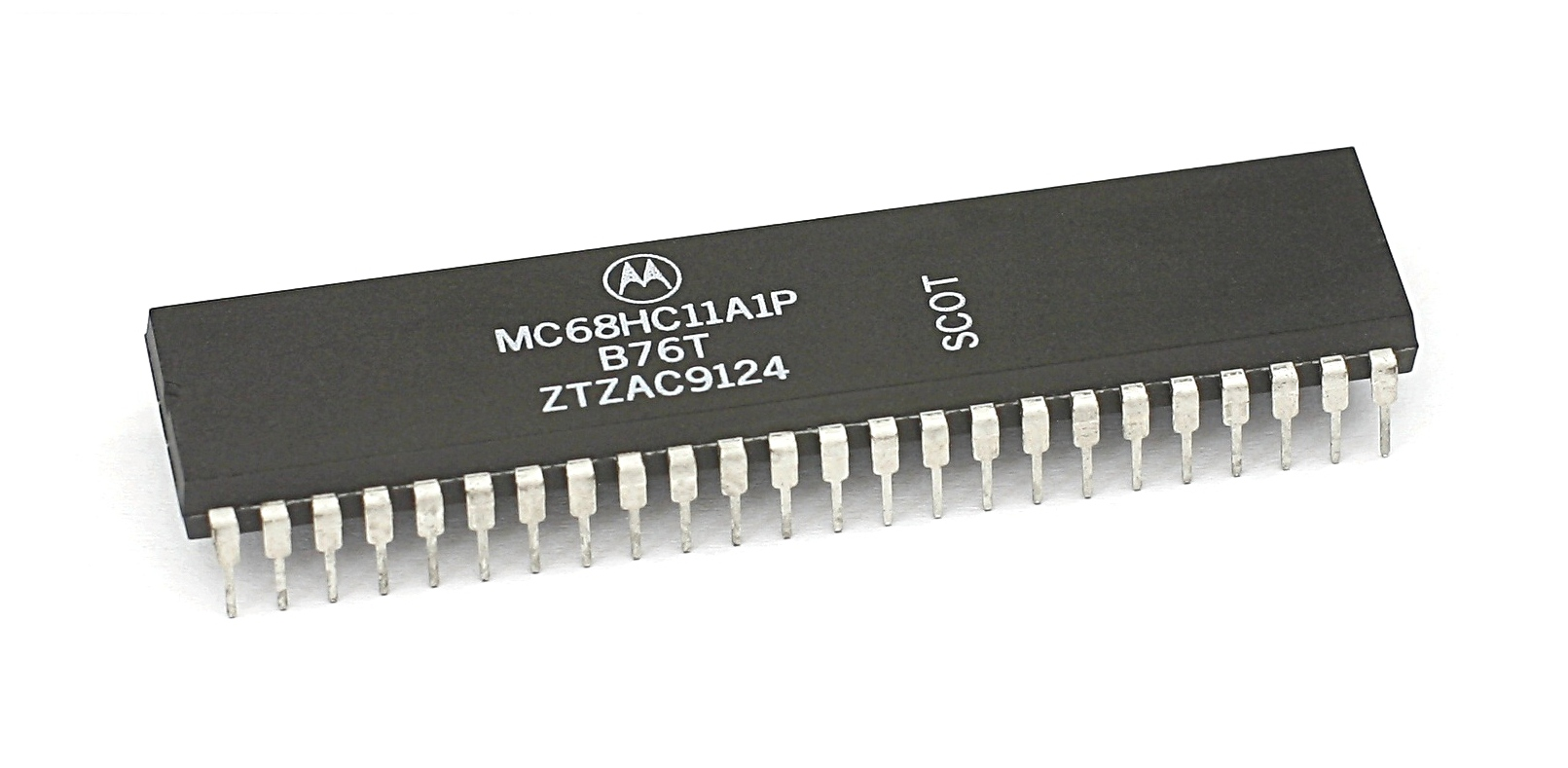
Motorola MC68HC11

Until 2004, these microcontrollers were developed and marketed by Motorola, whose semiconductor division was spun off to establish Freescale. In 2015, Freescale was acquired by NXP.

- 8-bit
  - Freescale S08
  - 68HC05 (CPU05)
  - 68HC08 (CPU08)
  - 68HC11 (CPU11)
- 16-bit
  - Freescale S12
  - 68HC12 (CPU12)
  - 68HC16 (CPU16)
  - Freescale DSP56800 (DSPcontroller)
- 32-bit
  - Freescale Kinetis (ARM architecture)
  - Freescale 683XX
  - MCF5xxx (Freescale Coldfire)
  - M·CORE
  - MPC500
  - MPC 860 (PowerQUICC)
  - MPC 8240/8250 (PowerQUICC II)
  - MPC 8540/8555/8560 (PowerQUICC III)
  - MPC 5554/5566
  - MPC 5777

== Holtek ==
Holtek Semiconductor is a major Taiwan-based designer of 32-bit microcontrollers, 8-bit microcontrollers and peripheral products. Microcontroller products are centred around an ARM core in the case of 32-bit products and 8051 based core and Holtek's own core in the case of 8-bit products. Located in the Hsinchu Science Park (), the company's product range includes the following microcontroller device series:

- HT32FXX 32-bit ARM core microcontroller series using Cortex-M0+, M3 and M4 cores
- HT85FXX 8051 Core based microcontroller series
- HT48FXX Flash I/O type series
- HT48RXX I/O type series
- HT46RXX A/D type series
- HT49RXX LCD type series
- HT82XX Computer Peripheral series
- HT95XX Telecom Peripheral series
- HT68FXX I/O Type Flash series
- HT66FXX A/D Type Flash series
- HK32XX 32-bit ARM core series

== Hyperstone ==
- 32-bit Hyperstone microprocessors: E1, introduced in 1990, and E2, introduced in 2009

== Infineon ==
Infineon offers microcontrollers for the automotive, industrial and multimarket industry. DAVE3, a component based auto code generation free tool, provides faster development of complex embedded projects.

- 8-bit
  - XC800 family Based on the 8051 architecture the XC800 is divided into the A-(Automotive) and I-(Industrial) Family, providing low cost micros, for example applied in applications like body, safety, motor control, intelligent lighting and electro mobility
- 16-bit
  - XE166 family, a Real Time Signal Controller applied in industrial applications
  - XC 2000 family, designed for Automotive applications
  - C166 family
  - C167 family
- 32-bit
  - Infineon XMC4000 is an ARM Cortex M4F based microcontroller family for industrial applications.
  - TriCore™ family is based on a unified RISC/MCU/DSP processor core. Infineon launched the first generation of AUDO (Automotive unified processor) in 1999. The TC1782 is the first member of the AUDO MAX family designed for automotive applications
  - Infineon XMC1000 is a 32-bit Industrial Microcontroller ARM® Cortex™-M0, 32 MHz.
  - Infineon Embedded Power Relay Driver IC (TLE984x) - ARM® Cortex™-M0 based family for automotive applications
  - Infineon Embedded Power 2-Phase Bridge Driver IC (TLE986x) - ARM® Cortex™-M3 based family for Brushed DC Motors
  - Infineon Embedded Power 3-Phase Bridge Driver IC (TLE987x) - ARM® Cortex™-M3 based family for Brushless DC Motors

== Intel ==
- 8-bit
  - MCS-48 8048 family – also incl. 8035, 8038, 8039, 8040, 8X42, 8X49, 8050; X=0 or 7
  - MCS-51 8051 family – also incl. 8X31, 8X32, 8X52; X=0, 3, 7 or 9
  - MCS-151 High-performance 8051 instruction set/binary compatible family
- 8/16-bit/32-bit
  - MCS-251 32-bit ALU with 1/8/16/32-bit CISC instruction set and 24-bit external address space (16-bit wide segmented). Fully binary compatible to the 8051 8-bit family.
- 16-bit
  - MCS-96 (8096 family – also incl. 8061)
  - Intel MCS-296

X	On-chip code memory
0	No on-chip memory
3	OTP
7	EEPROM
9	Flash

== Lattice Semiconductor ==
- Mico8 8-bit soft microprocessor
- Mico32 32-bit soft microprocessor

== Maxim Integrated ==
In 2021, Maxim Integrated was acquired by Analog Devices.

- 8051 Family
- MAXQ RISC Family
- Secure Micros Family
- ARM 922T
- MIPS 4kSD

== Microchip Technology ==
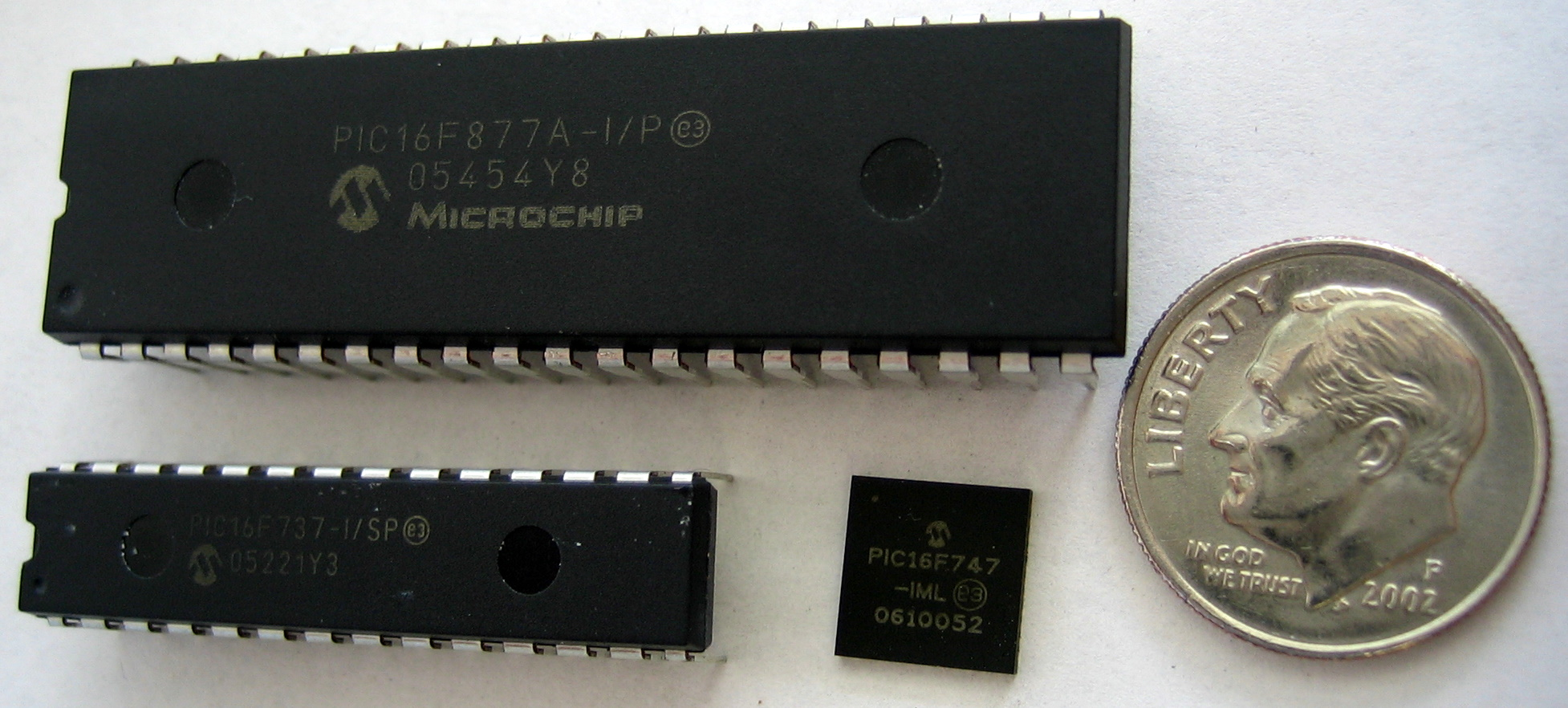
PIC microcontrollers

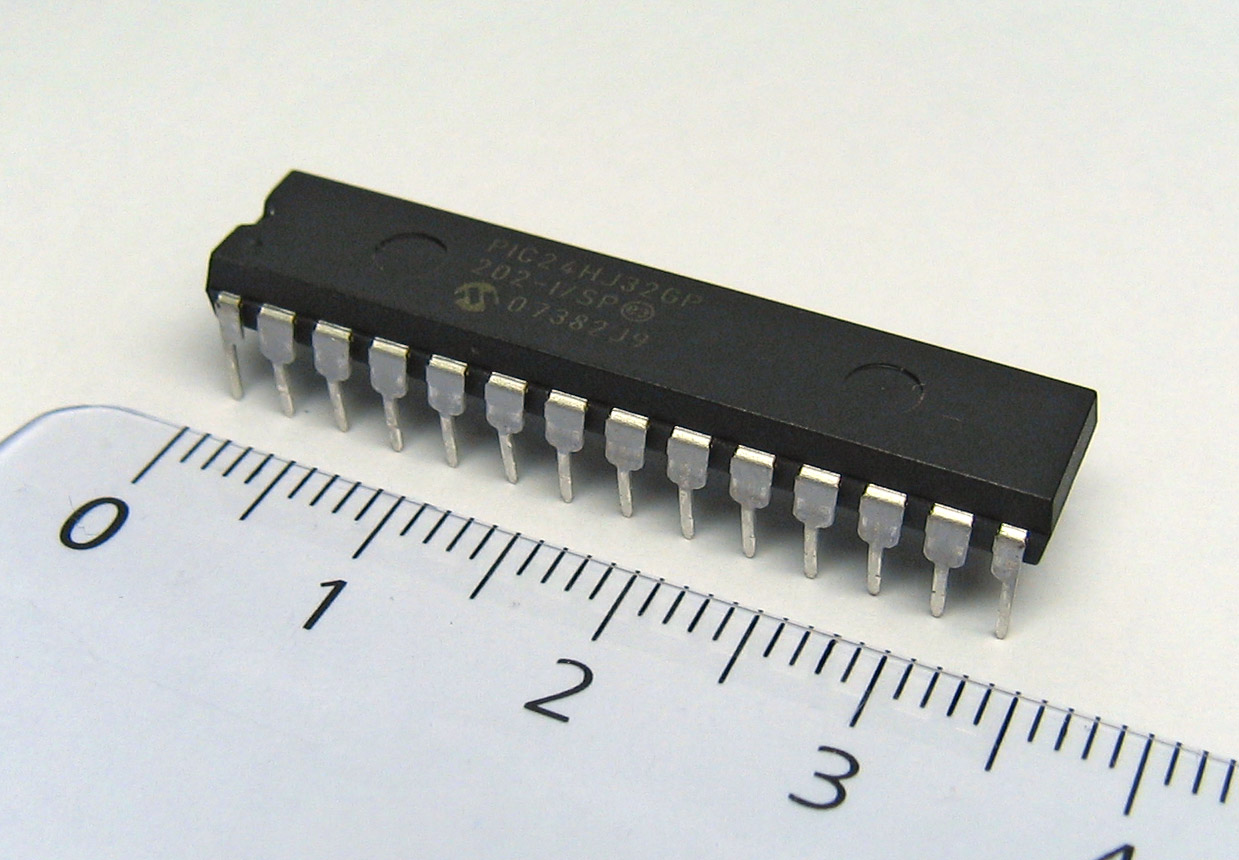
PIC24 microcontroller

Since 2013, Microchip has shipped over 1 billion PIC microcontrollers per year, growing every year.

Microchip produces microcontrollers with three very different architectures:

8-bit (8-bit data bus) PICmicro, with a single accumulator (8 bits):

- PIC10 and PIC12: 12-bit instruction words
- PIC16 series: 14-bit instruction words, one address pointer ("indirect register pair")
  - PIC16F628 (Replacement for very popular but discontinued PIC16F84) – PIC16F84A is still in production as of April 8, 2022.
- PIC18 series: 16-bit instruction words, three address pointers ("indirect register pairs")

16-bit (16-bit data bus) microcontrollers, with 16 general-purpose registers (each 16-bit)

- PIC24: 24-bit instruction words
- dsPIC: based on PIC24, plus DSP functions, such as a single-cycle MAC (multiply–accumulate) into two 40-bit accumulators.

32-bit (32-bit data bus) microcontrollers:

- PIC32MM Series: 16/32-bit instructions, uses the MIPS32 microAptiv UC Core MIPS architecture
- PIC32MX series: 32-bit instructions, uses the MIPS32 M4K Core MIPS architecture
- PIC32MZ series: 32-bit instructions, uses the MIPS32 M-Class Core MIPS architecture

== National Semiconductor ==
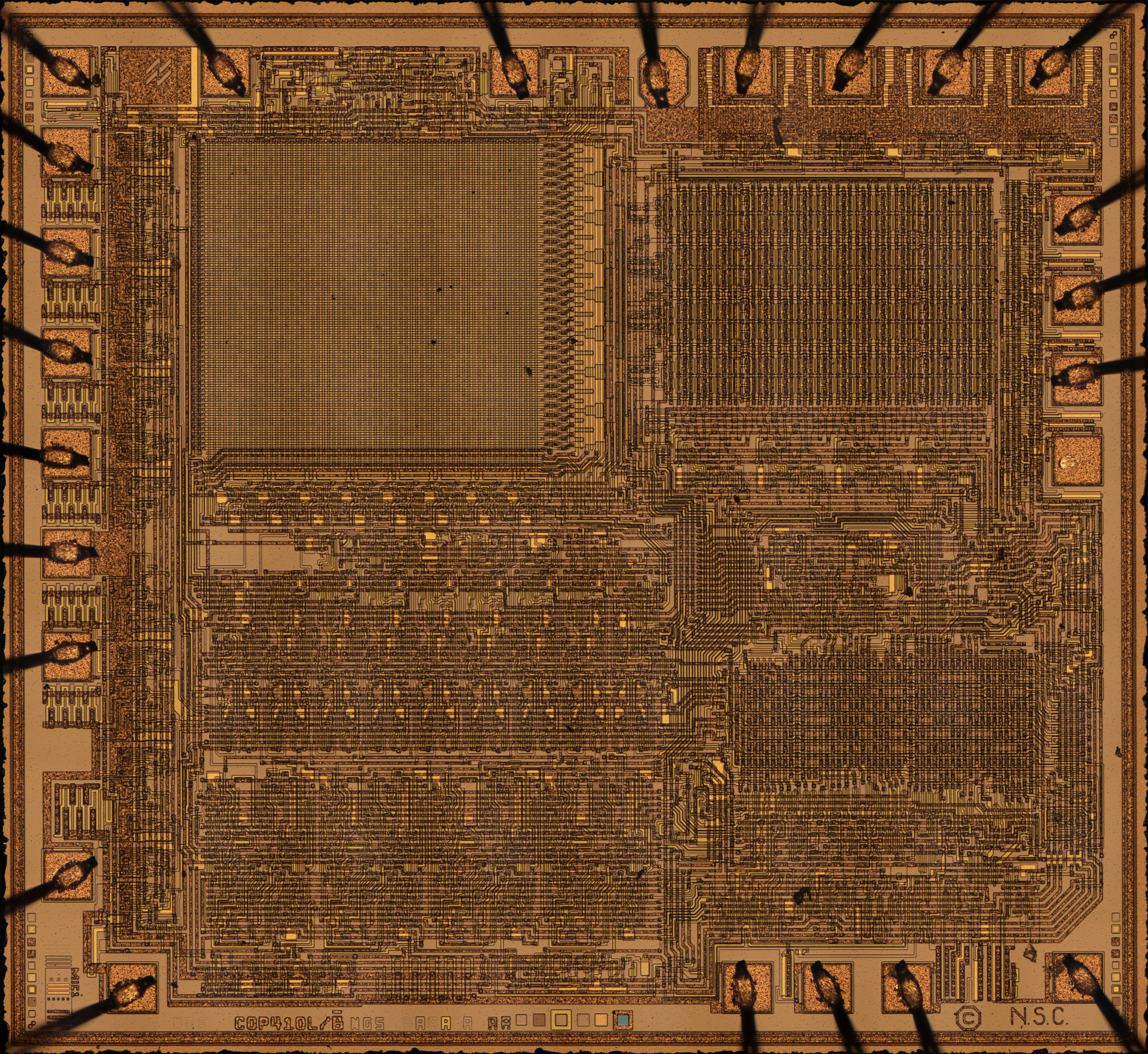
National Semiconductor COP410L die image

- 4-bit
  - COP400
- 8-bit
  - COP8
- 16-bit
  - CR16

== NEC ==
- 4-bit
  - 17K
  - 75X
  - 75XL
- 8-bit
  - 87XL
  - 87AD
- 78K Family (8/16-bit)
  - 8-bit: 78K/1, 78K/2, 78K/0, 78K0S
  - 16-bit: 78K/3, 78K/6, 78K/4, 78K0R
- 32-bit
  - V60–V80
  - V810/V830
  - V850

== Nordic Semiconductor ==
Nordic Semiconductor is a company with headquarters in Trondheim, Norway offering low power Bluetooth Low Energy SoCs as well as cellular network connectivity solutions for IoT devices.

- 32-bit BLE SoCs
  - NRF51, NRF52, NRF53 Series
- 32-bit Cellular IoT SIP
  - NRF91 Series

== NXP Semiconductors ==
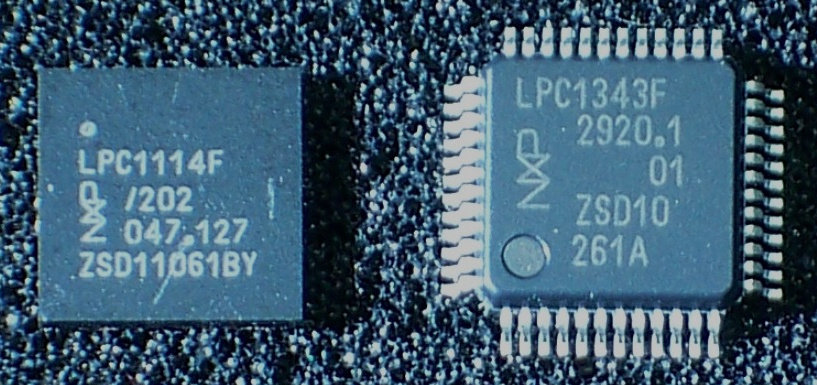
NXP LPC1114 and LPC1343

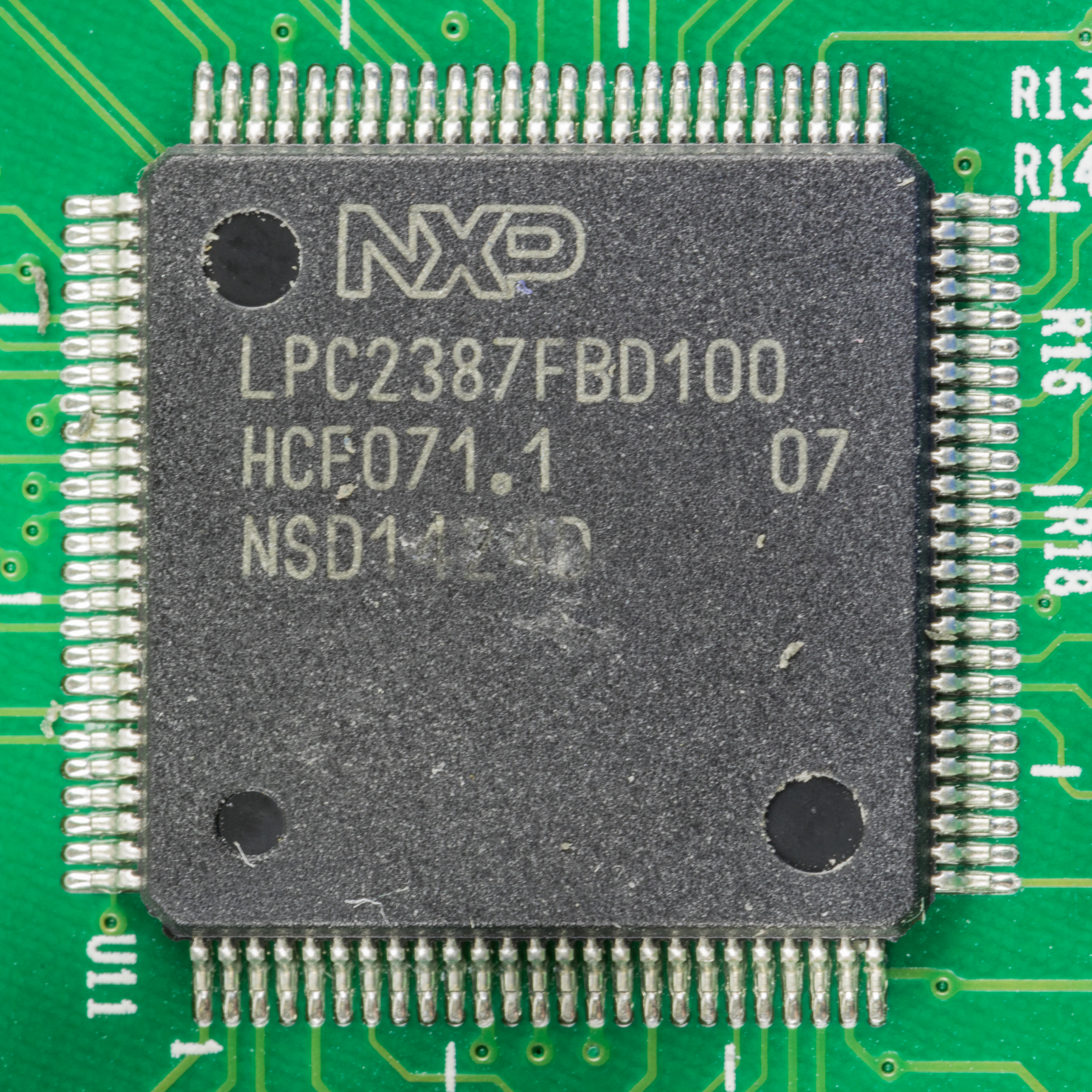
NXP LPC2387

- 8-bit
  - LPC700, LPC900 series are 80C51-based
- 16-bit
  - XA
- 32-bit
  - ARM7
    - LPC2100, LPC2200, LPC2300, LPC2400 series
  - ARM9
    - LPC2900, LPC3100, LPC3200 series
  - ARM Cortex-M0
    - LPC1100, LPC1200 series
  - ARM Cortex-M0+
    - LPC800 series
  - ARM Cortex-M3
    - LPC1300, LPC1700, LPC1800 series
  - ARM Cortex-M4
    - LPC4000, LPC4300 series
  - ARM Cortex-M7
    - RT1050, RT1050 series

== Nuvoton Technology ==
- 8-bit
  - 8051 MCUs
  - KM101 MCUs
- 32-bit
  - ARM Cortex-M0 MCUs
  - ARM Cortex-M4 MCUs
  - ARM Cortex-M7 MCUs
  - ARM Cortex-M23 MCUs
  - KM103 MCUs

== Panasonic ==
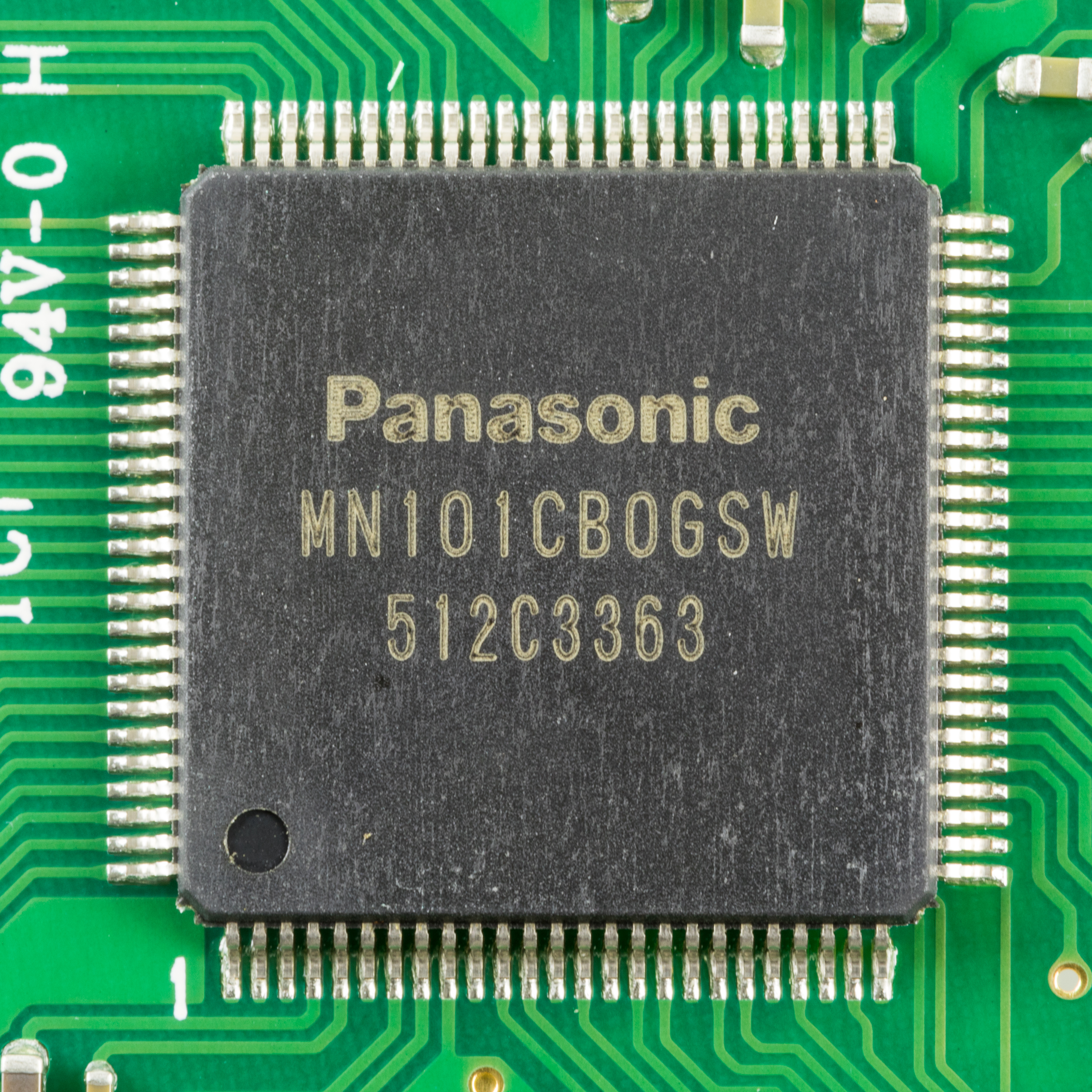
Panasonic MN101, used in an electronic glucose meter

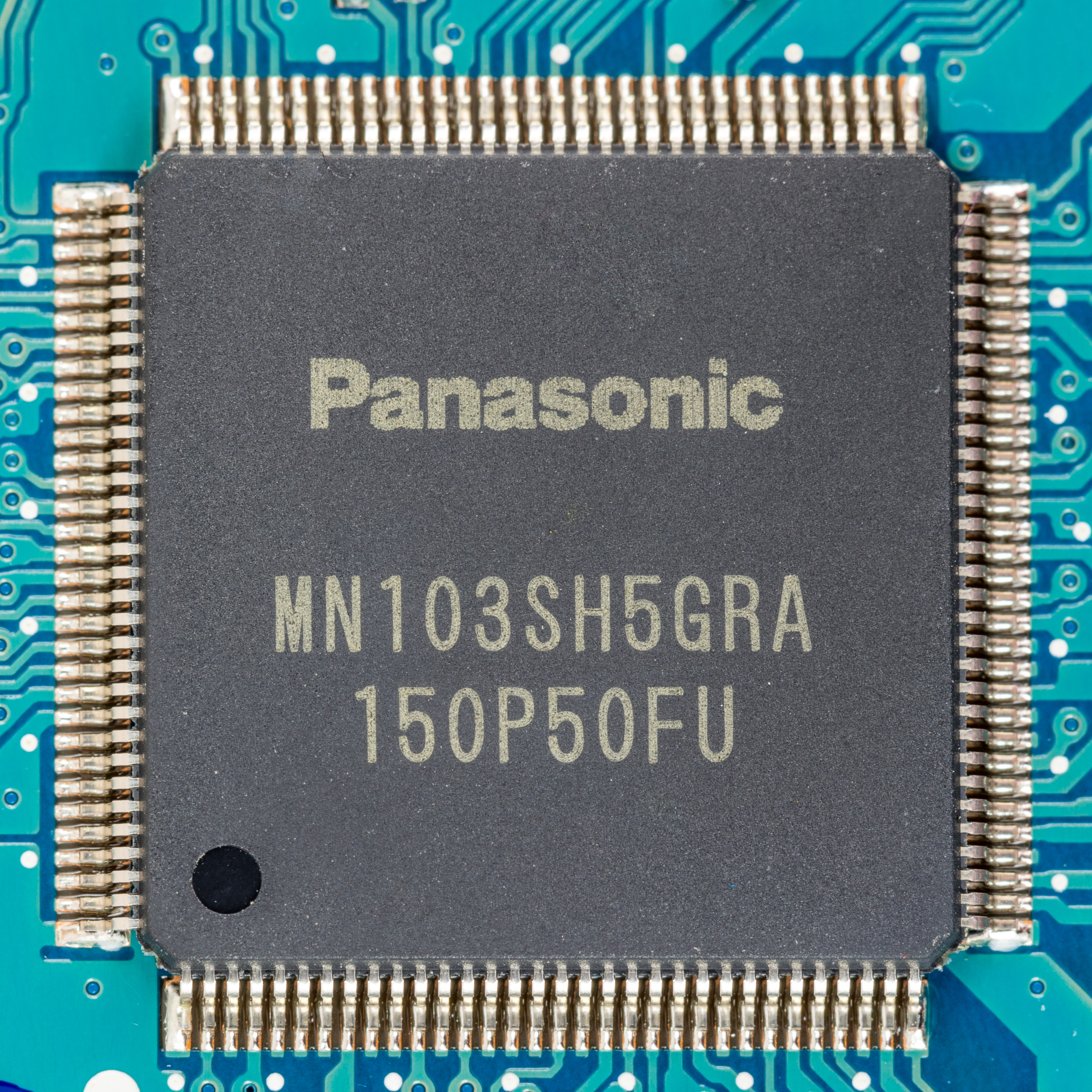
Panasonic MN103SH5GRA

- List of Panasonic Microcontrollers / microcomputers
- 4-bit
  - MN1400
  - MN1500
  - MN1700
- 8-bit
  - MN1870
  - MN1880
  - AM1 (MN101)
- 16-bit
  - AM2 (MN102)
- 32-bit
  - AM3, AM32 (MN1030, MN103, MN103E, MN103L, MN103S, MN103H)

== Parallax ==
- Basic Stamp
- SX
  - These were formerly made by Ubicom, former Scenix Semiconductor. The SX die has been discontinued by Ubicom. Parallax has accumulated a large stock of the dies and is managing the packaging.
  - SX-18, 20, 28, 48 and 52 versions (Note that the SX-18 and SX-52 have been discontinued)
- Propeller
  - The Propeller is a 8-core 32-bit microcontroller with 32 KB internal RAM.

== Rabbit Semiconductor ==
- Rabbit 2000
- Rabbit 3000
- Rabbit 4000
- Rabbit 5000
- Rabbit 6000

== Raspberry Pi ==
- 32-bit ARM Cortex-M0+
  - RP2040
- 32-bit ARM Cortex-M33
  - RP2350

== Renesas Electronics ==
Renesas is a joint venture comprising the semiconductor businesses of Hitachi, Mitsubishi Electric and NEC Electronics, creating the largest microcontroller manufacturer in the world.

- 4-bit microcontrollers
  - 720
- 8-bit microcontrollers
  - 78K0
  - 78K0S
  - 740
- 16-bit microcontrollers
  - RL78
  - 78K0R
  - R8C
  - M16C
  - H8S
  - H8
  - H8/Super Low Power
- 32-bit microcontrollers
  - RH850
  - RX
  - SuperH
  - V850
  - R32C
  - M32C
  - M32R
  - H8SX

== Redpine Signals ==
- RS14100
- RS13100

== Rockwell ==
Rockwell semiconductors (now called Conexant) created a line of 6502 based microcontrollers that were used with their telecom (modem) chips. Most of their microcontrollers were packaged in a QIP package.

- R6501
- R6511
- R8070

== Silicon Laboratories ==
Manufactures a line of 8-bit 8051-compatible microcontrollers, notable for high speeds (50–100 MIPS) and large memories in relatively small package sizes. A free IDE is available that supports the USB-connected ToolStick line of modular prototyping boards. These microcontrollers were originally developed by Cygnal. In 2012, the company introduced ARM-based mixed-signal MCUs with very low power and USB options, supported by free Eclipse-based tools. The company acquired Energy Micro in 2013 and now offers a number of ARM-based 32-bit microcontrollers.

- 8-bit
  - C8051
  - EFM8 series
- 32-bit
  - ARM Cortex-M0+
    - EFM32 Zero
  - ARM Cortex-M3
    - EFM32 Tiny, Gecko, Leopard, Giant
  - ARM Cortex-M4
    - EFM32 Wonder

== Silicon Motion ==
- SM2XX – Flash memory card controllers
- SM321 – USB 2.0
- SM323 – USB 2.0
- SM323E – USB 2.0
  - Silicon Motion's SM321E and SM324 controllers support SLC and MLC NAND flash from Samsung, Hynix, Toshiba and ST Micro as well as flash products from Renesas, Infineon and Micron. The SM321E is available in a 48-pin LQFP package and a 44-pin LGA package. The SM321E supports up to 4 SLC or MLC NAND flash chips with 4 bytes / 528 bytes ECC
- SM324 – USB 2.0
  - Supports dual-channel data transfer at read speeds of 233× (35 MB/s) and write speeds of 160× (24 MB/s), making it the fastest USB 2.0 flash disk controller in the market. The SM324 also has serial peripheral interface (SPI) which allows for not only Master and Slave modes, but the flexibility to develop more functionality into USB flash disk (UFD) products such as GPS, fingerprint sensor, Bluetooth and memory-capacity display. The SM324 is available in a 64-pin LQFP package. The SM324 supports 8 SLC or MLC NAND flash chips with 4 bytes / 528 bytes ECC.
- SM325 – USB 2.0
- SM330 – USB 2.0
- SM501, SM502 – Mobile Graphics
- SM712 – Mobile Graphics
- SM722 – Mobile Graphics
- SM340 – MP3/JPEG
- SM350 – MP3/JPEG
- SM370 – Image processing

== Sony ==
- SPC700 series
- SPC900 series
- SPC970 series
- SR110 series

== Spansion ==
Microcontrollers acquired from Fujitsu:

- F²MC Family (8/16-bit)
- FR Family (32-bit RISC)
- FR-V Family (32-bit RISC VLIW/vector processor)
- FM3 (Cortex M3)
- FM4 (Cortex M4)
- FCR4 (Cortex R4 with 90 nm Spansion Flash)

== STMicroelectronics ==
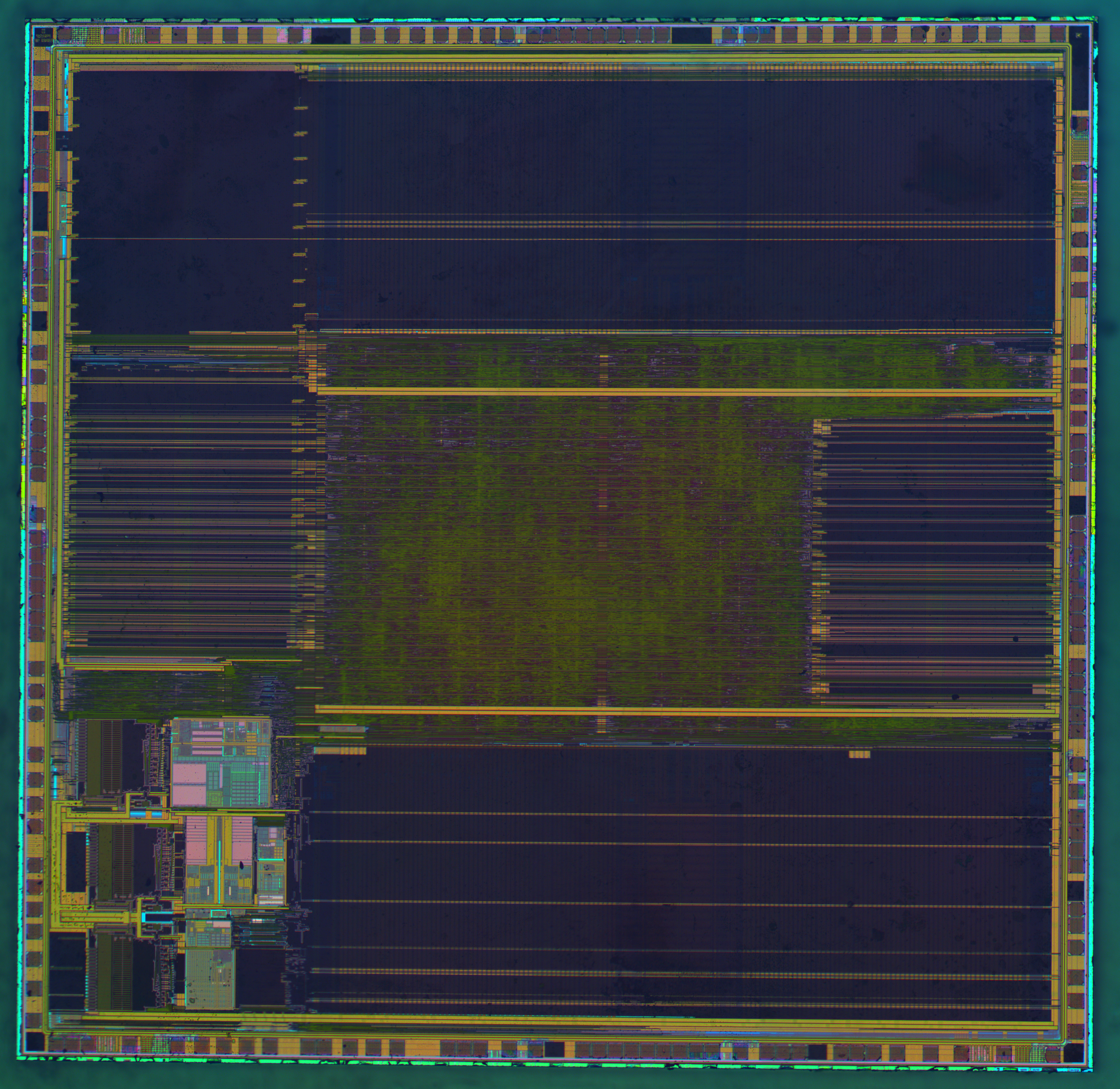
STM32F103VGT6 die

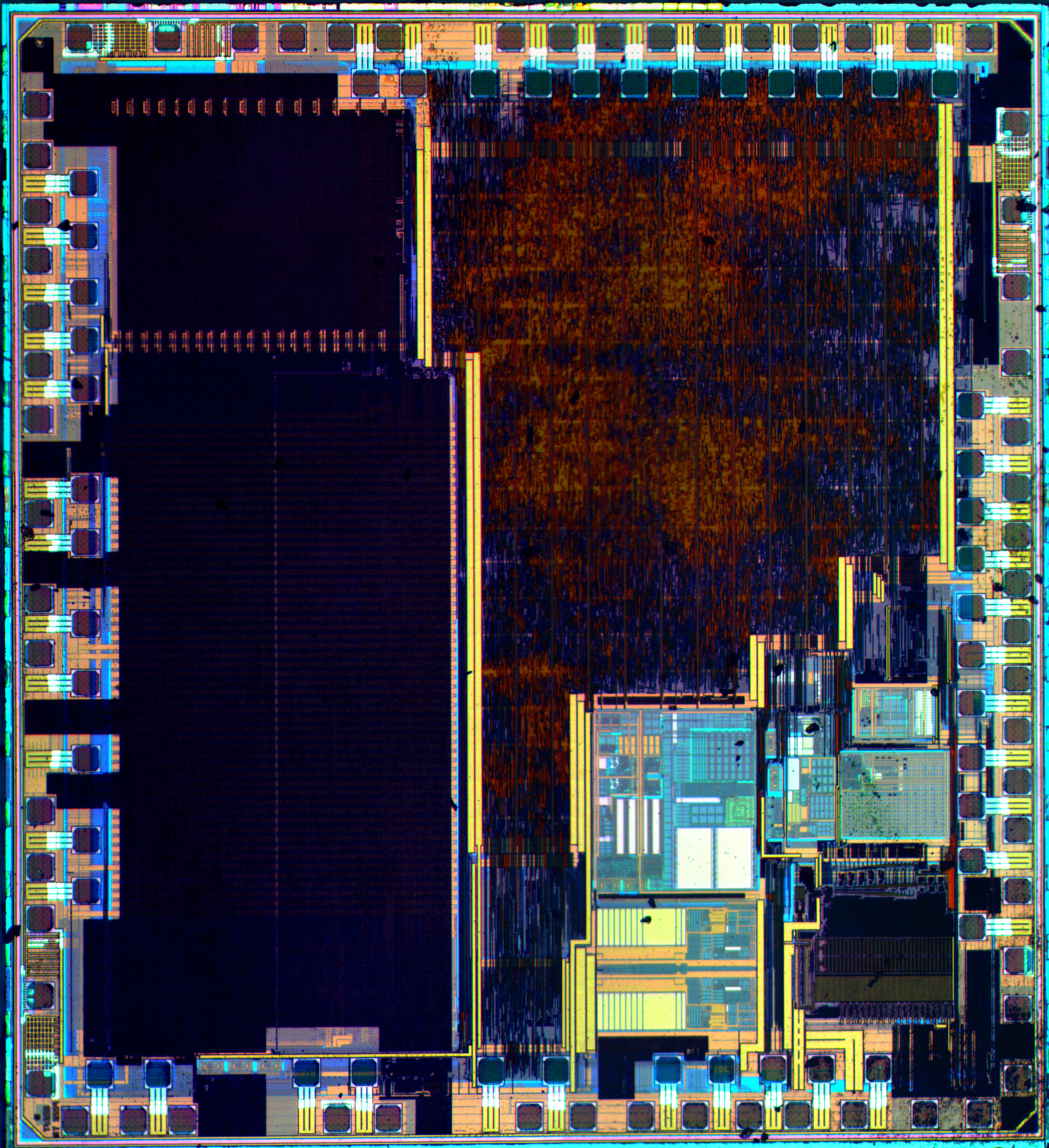
STM32F100C4T6B die

- 8-bit
  - ST6
  - ST7
  - STM8
  - μPSD (8032)
- 16-bit
  - ST10
- 32-bit
  - PowerPC
    - SPC5 32-bit Automotive microcontrollers integrating ST's proprietary embedded Flash technology.
  - ST20
  - ARM7
    - STR7 (ARM7TDMI)
  - ARM9
    - STR9 (ARM966E-S)
  - STM32 Family (STM32 Website) ARM Cortex-M
    - ARM Cortex-M0
      - STM32 F0, WB0
    - ARM Cortex-M0+
      - STM32 C0, G0, L0, WB
    - ARM Cortex-M3
      - STM32 F1, F2, L1
    - ARM Cortex-M4
      - STM32 F3, F4, G4, L4, WL, WB
    - ARM Cortex-M7
      - STM32 F7, H7
    - ARM Cortex-M33
      - STM32 U3, L5, U5, WBA, H5, C5

== Synopsys ==
While Synopsys does not manufacture or sell chips directly, Synopsys licenses the ARC Processor design to a variety of companies that, as of 2020, ship about 1.5 billion products based on ARC processors per year.

== Texas Instruments ==
- 4-bit
  - TMS1000
- 8-bit
  - TMS370
- 16-bit
  - MSP430
- 32-bit
  - MSPM0 series (ARM Cortex-M0+)
  - MSP432 (Obsolete)
  - TMS320 (DSP)
  - C2000
  - Stellaris (ARM Cortex-M3)
  - Tiva™ C Series
  - Hercules – TMS570 (ARM Cortex-R4), TMS470M ARM Cortex-M3, RM4 ARM Cortex-R4

The Stellaris and Tiva families, in particular, provide a high level of community-based, open source support through the TI e2e forums.

== Toshiba ==
- TLCS-47 (4-bit)
- TLCS-870 (8-bit CISC)
- TLCS-900 (16 and 32-bit CISC)
- TX19A (32-bit RISC)

== Ubicom ==
- IP2022
  - Ubicom's IP2022 is a high performance (120 MIPS) 8-bit microcontroller. Features include: 64k flash code memory, 16 KB PRAM (fast code and packet buffering), 4 KB data memory, 8-channel A/D, various timers, and on-chip support for Ethernet, USB, UART, SPI and GPSI interfaces.
- IP3022
  - IP3022 is Ubicom's latest high performance 32bit processor running at 250 MHz featuring eight hardware threads (barrel processor). It is specifically targeted at Wireless Routers.

== WCH ==
Manufactures a line of full-stack MCUs.

- Arm based chips
  - CH32F103
  - CH32F203
  - CH32F205
  - CH32F207
  - CH32F208
  - CH56X
  - CH57X
- RISC-V based chips
  - CH32V003
  - CH32V103
  - CH32V203
  - CH32V208
  - CH32V303
  - CH32V305
  - CH32V307
- 8051 based chips
  - CH55x

== Western Design Center ==
The Western Design Center licenses the 65C02 and 65816 designs to a variety of companies. Those companies produce the 6502 (typically as part of a larger chip) in quantities over a hundred million units per year.

== Xemics ==
- XE8000 8-bit microcontroller family

== Xilinx ==
- Microblaze 32-bit soft microprocessor
- Picoblaze 8-bit soft microprocessor

== XMOS ==
- XCore XS1 32-bit, Multicore Microcontrollers

== ZiLOG ==
Zilog's (primary) microcontroller families, in chronological order:

- Older:
  - Zilog Z8 – 8-bit Harvard architecture ROM / EPROM / OTP microcontroller with on-chip SRAM.
  - Zilog Z180 – Z80 based microcontroller; on-chip peripherals; external memory; 1 MB address space.
- Newer:
  - Zilog eZ8 – Better pipelined Z8 (2–3 times as clock cycle efficient as original Z8) with on-chip flash memory and SRAM.
  - Zilog eZ80 – Fast 8/16/24-bit Z80 (3–4 times as cycle efficient as original Z80) with flash, SRAM, peripherals; linear addressing of 16 MB.
  - Zilog Z16 – Fast 8/16/32-bit CPU with compact object code; 16 MB (4 GB possible) addressing range; flash, SRAM, peripherals, on chip.

== T2M Semi ==
T2M Semi develops semiconductor technologies including wireless connectivity SoCs, processor IP, and custom ASIC solutions.

=== Product families include: ===
- Wireless Connectivity SoCs

Bluetooth LE SoCs – Ultra-low-power Bluetooth Low Energy SoCs supporting BLE 5.x/6.x, Matter, Thread, Zigbee, and proprietary 2.4 GHz wireless protocols.

Bluetooth Audio SoCs – Bluetooth audio processors with integrated DSP and AI acceleration for TWS earbuds, headphones, speakers, and wearable audio devices.

Wi-Fi SoCs – Single-chip Wi-Fi solutions supporting high-speed wireless networking for IoT, multimedia, and industrial applications.

Wi-Fi + Bluetooth LE SoCs – Integrated Wi-Fi and Bluetooth Low Energy platforms for smart home, gaming, consumer, and connected devices.

Dual-Band Wi-Fi 6 + Bluetooth SoCs – Dual-band Wi-Fi 6 platforms with integrated Bluetooth supporting MU-MIMO, DBDC, and BLE Audio.

Matter over Thread SoCs – Low-power connectivity solutions implementing the Matter application layer over Thread mesh networking for smart home devices.
