= Soft microprocessor =

Microprocessor design embeddable in other computer systems

A soft microprocessor (also called softcore microprocessor or a soft processor) is a microprocessor core that can be wholly implemented using logic synthesis. It can be implemented via different semiconductor devices containing programmable logic (e.g., FPGA, CPLD), including both high-end and commodity variations.

Most systems, if they use a soft processor at all, only use a single soft processor. However, a few designers tile as many soft cores onto an FPGA as will fit. In those multi-core systems, rarely used resources can be shared between all the cores in a cluster.

While many people put exactly one soft microprocessor on a FPGA, a sufficiently large FPGA can hold two or more soft microprocessors, resulting in a multi-core processor. The number of soft processors on a single FPGA is limited only by the size of the FPGA. Some people have put dozens or hundreds of soft microprocessors on a single FPGA. This is one way to implement massive parallelism in computing and can likewise be applied to in-memory computing.

A soft microprocessor and its surrounding peripherals implemented in a FPGA is less vulnerable to obsolescence than a discrete processor.

== Core comparison ==
Processor	Developer	Open source	Bus support	Notes	Project home	Description language
based on the ARM instruction set architecture
Amber	Conor Santifort	LGPLv2.1	Wishbone	ARMv2a 3-stage or 5-stage pipeline	https://opencores.org/project/amber	Verilog
Cortex-M1	ARM	No	http://www.arm.com/products/system-ip/interconnect/index.php	70–200 MHz, 32-bit RISC	http://www.arm.com/products/CPUs/ARM_Cortex-M1.html	Verilog
based on the AVR instruction set architecture
Navré	Sébastien Bourdeauducq	Yes	Direct SRAM	Atmel AVR-compatible 8-bit RISC	http://opencores.org/project,navre	Verilog
pAVR	Doru Cuturela	Yes		Atmel AVR-compatible 8-bit RISC	http://opencores.org/project,pavr	VHDL
softavrcore	Andras Pal	Yes	Standard AVR buses (core-coupled I/O, synchronous SRAM, synchronous program ROM)	Atmel AVR-compatible 8-bit RISC (up to AVR5), peripherals and SoC features included	http://opencores.org/project/softavrcore	Verilog
based on the MicroBlaze instruction set architecture
AEMB	Shawn Tan	Yes	Wishbone	MicroBlaze EDK 3.2 compatible	http://www.aeste.my/aemb	Verilog
MicroBlaze	Xilinx	No	PLB, OPB, FSL, LMB, AXI4		https://web.archive.org/web/20030430214925/http://www.xilinx.com/microblaze/	
OpenFire	Virginia Tech CCM Lab	Yes	OPB, FSL	Binary compatible with the MicroBlaze	https://web.archive.org/web/20090724052731/http://www.ccm.ece.vt.edu/~scraven/openfire.html, http://opencores.org/project,openfire_core,overview	Verilog
SecretBlaze	LIRMM, University of Montpellier / CNRS	Yes	Wishbone	MicroBlaze ISA, VHDL	http://www.lirmm.fr/ADAC/?page_id=462	VHDL
based on the MCS-51 instruction set architecture
MCL51	MicroCore Labs	Yes	Ultra-small-footprint microsequencer-based 8051 core	312 Artix-7 LUTs. Quad-core 8051 version is 1227 LUTs.	http://www.microcorelabs.com	
TSK51/52	Altium	Royalty-free	Wishbone / Intel 8051	8-bit Intel 8051 instruction set compatible, lower clock cycle alternative	https://web.archive.org/web/20160306202550/http://wiki.altium.com/display/adoh/processor-based+fpga+design, https://web.archive.org/web/20131008041359/http://wiki.altium.com/display/ADOH/TSK51x+MCU	
based on the MIPS instruction set architecture
BERI	University of Cambridge	BSD		MIPS	http://www.cl.cam.ac.uk/research/security/ctsrd/beri/	Bluespec
Dossmatik	René Doss	CC BY-NC 3.0; commercial applicants have to pay a licence fee	Pipelined bus	MIPS I instruction set pipeline stages	http://www.dossmatik.de/mais-cpu.html	VHDL
TSK3000A	Altium	Royalty-free	Wishbone	32-bit R3000-style RISC modified Harvard architecture CPU	https://web.archive.org/web/20131020113429/http://wiki.altium.com/display/ADOH/TSK3000A	
based on the PicoBlaze instruction set architecture
PacoBlaze	Pablo Bleyer	Yes		Compatible with the PicoBlaze processors	http://bleyer.org/pacoblaze	Verilog
PicoBlaze	Xilinx	No			https://web.archive.org/web/20030501203653/http://www.xilinx.com/picoblaze/	VHDL, Verilog
based on the RISC-V instruction set architecture
f32c	University of Zagreb	BSD	AXI, SDRAM, SRAM	32-bit, RISC-V / MIPS ISA subsets (retargetable), GCC toolchain	https://github.com/f32c/f32c	VHDL
NEORV32	Stephan Nolting	BSD	Wishbone b4, AXI4	rv32[i/e] [m] [a] [c] [b] [u] [Zfinx] [Zicsr] [Zifencei], RISC-V-compliant, CPU & SoC available, highly customizable, GCC toolchain	https://github.com/stnolting/neorv32, https://opencores.org/projects/neorv32	VHDL
VexRiscv	SpinalHDL	Yes	AXI4 / Avalon	32-bit, RISC-V, up to 340 MHz on Artix 7. Up to 1.44 DMIPS/MHz.	https://github.com/SpinalHDL/VexRiscv	VHDLVerilog (SpinalHDL)
based on the SPARC instruction set architecture
LEON2(-FT)	ESA	Yes	AMBA2	SPARC V8	http://www.esa.int/TEC/Microelectronics/SEMUD70CYTE_0.html	VHDL
LEON3/4	Aeroflex Gaisler	Yes	AMBA2	SPARC V8	http://www.gaisler.com/cms/index.php?option=com_content&task=view&id=156&Itemid=104	VHDL
OpenPiton	Princeton Parallel Group	Yes		Manycore SPARC V9	http://parallel.princeton.edu/openpiton/specs.html	Verilog
OpenSPARC T1	Sun	Yes		64-bit	http://www.opensparc.net/opensparc-t1/index.html	Verilog
Tacus/PIPE5	TemLib	Yes	Pipelined bus	SPARC V8	http://temlib.org	VHDL
based on the x86 instruction set architecture
CPU86	HT-Lab	Yes		8088-compatible CPU in VHDL	http://www.ht-lab.com/cpu86.htm	VHDL
MCL86	MicroCore Labs	Yes	8088 BIU provided. Others easy to create.	Cycle accurate 8088/8086 implemented with a microsequencer. Less than 2% utilization of Kintex-7.	http://www.microcorelabs.com	
s80x86	Jamie Iles	GPLv3	Custom	80186-compatible GPLv3 core	https://www.jamieiles.com/80186/	SystemVerilog
Zet	Zeus Gómez Marmolejo	Yes	Wishbone	x86 PC clone	https://web.archive.org/web/20130215004406/http://zet.aluzina.org/index.php/Zet_processor	Verilog
ao486	Aleksander Osman	3-clause BSD	Avalon	i486SX compatible core	https://github.com/alfikpl/ao486	Verilog
based on the PowerPC/Power instruction set architecture
PowerPC 405S	IBM	No	CoreConnect	32-bit PowerPC v.2.03 Book E		Verilog
PowerPC 440S	IBM	No	CoreConnect	32-bit PowerPC v.2.03 Book E		Verilog
PowerPC 470S	IBM	No	CoreConnect	32-bit PowerPC v.2.05 Book E		Verilog
Microwatt	IBM/OpenPOWER	CC-BY 4.0	Wishbone	64-bit PowerISA 3.0 proof of concept	https://github.com/antonblanchard/microwatt	VHDL
Chiselwatt	IBM/OpenPOWER	CC-BY 4.0	Wishbone	64-bit PowerISA 3.0	https://github.com/antonblanchard/chiselwatt	Chisel
Libre-SOC	Libre-SoC.org	BSD/LGPLv2+	Wishbone	64-bit PowerISA 3.0. CPU/GPU/VPU implementation and custom vector instructions	https://libre-soc.org	Python/nMigen
A2I	IBM/OpenPOWER	CC-BY 4.0	Custom PBus	64-bit PowerPC 2.6 Book E. In order core	https://github.com/openpower-cores/a2i	VHDL
A2O	IBM/OpenPOWER	CC-BY 4.0	Custom PBus	64-bit PowerPC 2.7 Book E. Out of order core	https://github.com/openpower-cores/a2o	Verilog
Other architectures
ARC	ARC International, Synopsys	No		16/32/64-bit ISA RISC	https://www.synopsys.com/designware-ip/processor-solutions.html	Verilog
ERIC5	Entner Electronics	No		9-bit RISC, very small size, C-programmable	https://web.archive.org/web/20160305131214/http://www.entner-electronics.com/tl/index.php/eric5.html	VHDL
H2 CPU	Richard James Howe	MIT	Custom	16-bit stack machine, designed to execute Forth directly, small	https://github.com/howerj/forth-cpu	VHDL
Instant SoC	FPGA Cores	No	Custom	32-bit RISC-V M Extension, SoC defined by C++	http://www.fpga-cores.com/instant-soc/	VHDL
JOP	Martin Schoeberl	Yes	SimpCon / Wishbone (extension)	Stack-oriented, hard real-time support, executing Java bytecode directly	https://web.archive.org/web/20190417225405/http://www.jopdesign.com/	VHDL
LatticeMico8	Lattice	Yes	Wishbone		http://www.latticesemi.com/Products/DesignSoftwareAndIP/IntellectualProperty/IPCore/IPCores02/Mico8.aspx	Verilog
LatticeMico32	Lattice	Yes	Wishbone		http://www.latticesemi.com/products/intellectualproperty/ipcores/mico32/index.cfm	Verilog
LXP32	Alex Kuznetsov	MIT	Wishbone	32-bit, 3-stage pipeline, register file based on block RAM	https://lxp32.github.io/	VHDL
MCL65	MicroCore Labs	Yes	Ultra-small-footprint microsequencer-based 6502 core	252 Spartan-7 LUTs. Clock cycle-exact.	https://github.com/MicroCoreLabs/Projects	
MRISC32-A1	Marcus Geelnard	Yes	Wishbone, B4/pipelined	32-bit RISC/Vector CPU implementing the MRISC32 ISA	https://mrisc32.bitsnbites.eu/	VHDL
NEO430	Stephan Nolting	Yes	Wishbone (Avalon, AXI4-Lite)	16-bit MSP430 ISA-compatible, very small size, many peripherals, highly customizable	https://github.com/stnolting/neo430	VHDL
Nios, Nios II	Altera	No	Avalon		https://web.archive.org/web/20101225092752/http://www.altera.com/products/ip/processors/nios2/ni2-index.html	Verilog
OpenRISC	OpenCores	Yes	Wishbone	32-bit; done in ASIC, Actel, Altera, Xilinx FPGA.	https://openrisc.io/	Verilog
SpartanMC	TU Darmstadt / TU Dresden	Yes	Custom (AXI support in development)	18-bit ISA (GNU Binutils / GCC support in development)	http://www.spartanmc.de	Verilog
SYNPIC12	Miguel Angel Ajo Pelayo	MIT		PIC12F compatible, program synthesised in gates	http://projects.nbee.es/display/IPCORES/SYNPIC12+8bit+RISC+CPU+core	VHDL
xr16	Jan Gray	No	XSOC abstract bus	16-bit RISC CPU and SoC featured in Circuit Cellar Magazine #116-118	http://www.fpgacpu.org/xsoc/index.html	Schematic
YASEP	Yann Guidon	AGPLv3	Direct SRAM	16 or 32 bits, RTL in VHDL & asm in JS, microcontroller subset : ready	http://yasep.org, https://web.archive.org/web/20121207045204/http://yasep.org/VHDL/, http://yasep.org/#!ASM/impASM#examples/keywords.yas	VHDL
ZipCPU	Gisselquist Technology	GPLv3	Wishbone, B4/pipelined	32-bit CPU targeted for minimal FPGA resource usage	http://zipcpu.com/about/zipcpu.html, http://zipcpu.com/about/gisselquist-technology.html	Verilog
ZPU	Zylin AS	Yes	Wishbone	Stack based CPU, configurable 16/32 bit datapath, eCos support	http://opensource.zylin.com/zpu.htm	VHDL
RISC5	Niklaus Wirth	Yes	Custom	Running a complete graphical Oberon System including an editor and compiler. Software can be developed and ran on the same FPGA board.	http://www.projectoberon.com/	Verilog

== See also ==
- Network-on-a-chip (NoC)
- Reconfigurable computing
- Hardware acceleration
- CPU simulator
