= Nios embedded processor =

Nios was Altera's first configurable 16-bit embedded soft processor for its FPGA product-line. It was subsequently replaced by the 32-bit Nios II.

== See also ==
- LatticeMico8
- LatticeMico32
- MicroBlaze
- PicoBlaze
