= DCR =

DCR may refer to:

== Computing ==
- .dcr, a raw image format
- Decision composite residuosity in cryptography, see Computational hardness assumption
- Design change request, also document change request and database change request
- Device control register, a hardware register that controls some computer hardware device like a peripheral or an expansion card

== Railways ==
- DCRail, a British freight operating company
- Delmarva Central Railroad, a short-line railroad serving Delaware, Maryland, and Virginia on the Delmarva Peninsula
- Dubois County Railroad, a Class III short-line railroad serving Dubois County in southern Indiana, United States

== Engineering ==
- DC resistance of an inductor, see Equivalent series resistance
- Direct-conversion receiver
- Dynamic compression ratio, referring to the compression ratio of a combustion engine

== Other ==
- Dacryocystorhinostomy, a surgical procedure to restore the flow of tears into the nose
- Dale Coyne Racing, an American auto racing team
- Debt coverage ratio, another term for debt service coverage ratio (DSCR)
- Digital cable ready, indicating that a television is capable of receiving cable TV without a set-top box
- Deglaciation climate reversal, see Younger Dryas
- Department of Conservation and Recreation, a Massachusetts state agency best known for its parks and parkways
- Diploma of the College of Radiographers, abbreviated as DC(R), a qualification that was formerly awarded by the College of Radiographers, see Society and College of Radiographers
- Distributed constraint reasoning, see Distributed constraint optimization
- Division CuiRassée, a French armoured division in the Battle of France in 1940, see List of French divisions in World War II#Cavalry, mechanized and armoured divisions
- Docu Center Ramstein, the Center for Documentation and Exhibition of the History of US Americans in the Rhineland Palatinate
- Dropped-call rate, a term in telecommunications denoting the percentage of calls which due to technical reasons were cut off before the speaking parties had finished their conversation and before one of them had hung up
- Dual Cycle Rifle, a NATO calibre revolver-type assault rifle
- Durham College Rowing, an organization representing all college boat clubs in Durham University
- Dynamic contrast ratio, referring to the contrast ratio property of a display system
- ISO 639-3 code for the extinct language Negerhollands.
