= Laser cutting bridge =

Textile cutting machine

In textile manufacturing, a laser cutting bridge system is an industrial machine for cutting and engraving textile materials (i.e. fabrics). It is formed by a galvanometric laser head and carbon-dioxide laser (CO_{2} laser) source that runs along a horizontal beam (the bridge) supported by two lateral columns and sometimes by central columns. This system is placed over one or more embroidery machines, more frequently multi-head rather than single-head machines, cutting tables and roller devices to cut out and/or engrave embroidered fabrics.

== History ==
The first laser bridge for embroidery machines was invented and realized in 1998 by GMI srl an Italian company based in Vittorio Veneto (TV), Italy. The Laser cutting bridge was first presented to the public at the IMB exhibition of Cologne, Germany, in 2000. GMI srl continues manufacturing laser bridges and since 1998 has largely improved the quality of its cutting systems.

Before the advent of the laser bridge, fabrics were first die-cut and then appliqués were sewn or embroidered on the base fabric. Usually used was an 8 mm thick steel die with heights ranging from 50 to 100 mm depending on how many pieces were to be cut at once. This process proved to present numerous difficulties.

== Technology ==
A cut piece of cloth (the appliqué) is placed above the base material that is in the embroidery machine (having a first seam reference), is fixed and finally embroidered. More recently, the manual method of cutting has been replaced by the laser cutting technology, laser plotters first, and then by laser bridges. The laser ensures better accuracy compared to manual cutting. It allows users to imitate a jagged or irregular cut as if done by hand, with the advantage that the laser solders the borders of synthetic fiber, avoiding unpleasant unthreading which is called "the clean edge". The combination "laser plus embroidery machine" offered by the laser bridge also avoids double work: no longer is it necessary to cut by hand after embroidering appliqués.

The process also guarantees more accurate results, because the laser works on the same frame where the embroidery machine works avoiding positioning errors. The technology uses software that guides the cutting laser head along the bridge and the reflecting mirrors (moved by electromagnetic motors). This method provides a degree of accuracy and speed of cut much greater than traditional systems (1/100 mm instead of 1/10 mm).
