= Picotux =

Linux single-board computer

- Released: May 18, 2005
- Introductory price: €99
- Operating system: µClinux
- CPU: 55MHz 32-bit ARM7 NS7520
- Memory: 8MB SDRAM
- Power: 3.3V, 250 mA
- Weight: 18 grams
- Website: http://www.picotux.com

The Picotux is a single-board computer launched in 2005, running Linux. There are several different kinds of picotux available, but the main one is the picotux 100. The Picotux was released for availability on 18 May 2005. It is 35 mm × 19 mm × 19 mm and just barely larger than an 8P8C modular connector.

== Technology ==
The picotux 100 operates a 55 MHz 32-bit ARM7 Netsilicon NS7520 processor, with 2 MB of flash memory (750 KB of which contains the OS) and 8 MB SDRAM Memory. The operating system is μClinux 2.4.27 Big Endian. BusyBox 1.0 is used as main shell. The picotux system runs at 250 mA only and 3.3 V +/- 5%.

Two communication interfaces are provided, 10/100 Mbit/s half/full duplex Ethernet and a serial port with up to 230,400 bit/s. Five additional lines can be used for either general input/output or serial handshaking.

== See also ==
- Microcontroller
