= Bus bridge =

Bus bridge or variant may refer to:

- Rail replacement bus service
- bridge subtype, reserved or specialized for buses
- Busbar subtype that connects busbars together
- bus (computing) subtype that connects computer buses together
  - IBM Bus Bridge, see CoreConnect
