= Dropped-call rate =

Metric in telecommunications

In telecommunications, the dropped-call rate (DCR) is the fraction of the telephone calls which, due to technical reasons, were cut off before the speaking parties had finished their conversational tone and before one of them had hung up (dropped calls). This fraction is usually measured as a percentage of all calls.

A call attempt invokes a call setup procedure, which, if successful, results in a connected call. A connected call may be terminated (disconnected) due to a technical reason before the parties making the call would wish to do so (in ordinary phone calls this would mean before either of the parties has hung up). Such calls are classified as dropped calls. In many practical cases this definition needs to be further expanded with a number of detailed specifications describing which calls exactly are counted as dropped, at what stage of the call setup procedure a call is counted as connected, etc. In modern telecommunication systems, such as cellular networks, the call setup procedure may be very complex and the point at which a call is considered successfully connected may be defined in a number of ways, thus influencing the way the dropped-call rate is calculated.

The dropped-call rate in conventional (land-line) networks is extremely low: significantly less than 0.01%. In mobile communication systems using radio channels the dropped-call rate is higher and may range for commercial networks between 0.1% and a few percent. The main reasons for dropped calls in mobile networks are lack of radio coverage (either in the downlink or the uplink), radio interference between different subscribers, imperfections in the functioning of the network (such as failed handover or cell-reselection attempts), overload of the different elements of the network (such as cells), etc.

The dropped-call rate is one of the key performance indicators (KPI) used by the network operators to assess the performance of their networks. It is assumed to have direct influence on the customer satisfaction with the service provided by the network and its operator. The dropped-call rate is usually included, together with other technical parameters of the network, in a key performance indicator known as call retainability.

Telecommunication network operators aim at reducing the call dropped rate as much as practical and affordable. In mobile networks this is achieved by improving radio coverage, expanding the capacity of the network and optimising the performance of its elements, all of which may require considerable effort and significant investments on the part of the mobile network operator.

== Indian dropped call compensation case ==
The Telecom Regulatory Authority of India (TRAI) has announced a compensation of Re.1 for every call up to a maximum of three calls everyday effect from January 1, 2016.

This decision was challenged by telecoms, which lost their case in the Delhi High Court.

- Telecoms had argued that the order that penalized them was “populist” and unfair because connectivity is affected by factors beyond their control. They also argued that they've spent on installing two lakh telecom towers over the last 15 months.
- TRAI, on the other hand, had said that telecoms are earning huge amounts of revenue and can and should expand their investment in infrastructure.

The court termed the TRAI notification as “flawed, unconstitutional, arbitrary and unreasonable”. The court was also of the view that a transparent procedure was not followed while evolving it.

- The court said the regulation which fastens strict liability on the telecom companies for no fault of theirs is arbitrary and violative of Article 14 of the Constitution.
- The court also observed that quality of Service Regulations allowed service providers a 2% allowance of call drops on the basis of averaging call drops per month and therefore, the companies cannot be penalised when they were compliant with this norm.
- Also, the court said, there is no legal basis or explanation in the 2015 Regulations as to why the compensation has been limited to only three call drops.

== See also ==
- Cellular network
- Call setup success rate
- Routing in cellular networks
- Telephony quality of service
- Telecommunications service provider
- Telecom Regulatory Authority of India
