= Device control register =

In computing, a device control register is a hardware register that controls some computer hardware device, for example a peripheral or an expansion card.

Specific technologies use this terminology with a narrower meaning:

- The ISA PNP specification divides the registers of a device in two categories: control registers and configuration registers. One of the device control registers defined by ISA PNP is (for example) the Activate register, which turns the card on or off.
- The Device Control Register is also the name of a specific register in the PCI Express architecture. It has fields that (among other things) control what is the maximum read request size (in bytes) that the device can make.
- Device Control Register (DCR) is also the name of an IBM proprietary bus. Its stated design goal is to "transfer data between a DCR master, typically a CPU’s general purpose registers, and the DCR slave logic’s device control registers". For example, the IBM MultiProcessor Interrupt Controller (MPIC) is connected up to four processors via a shared DCR bus, and in turn the MPIC handles up to 128 interrupt sources.
