= XE8000 =

The XE8000 series is a low-power microcontroller family from XEMICS (now a business unit of Semtech). Advanced analog features are combined with a proprietary RISC CPU named CoolRISC on all XE8000 devices. The CPU has 8-bits data bus and 22 bits instruction bus. All instructions (including 8*8 bit multiplication) are executed in 1 clock cycle. The analog features include the ZoomingADC a new type of delta-sigma modulator for analog-to-digital conversion that includes capabilities to amplify and offset the input signal during the acquisition.

UART, timers, RAM, MTP-ROM ("flash" program memory), watchdog timer, analog-to-digital converter, digital-to-analog converter, RC and XTAL oscillators, interrupts, I/O, drivers for seven segment displays and RF interface are possible on-chip features.

== XE8000 devices ==
For sensor interfacing:

- XE88LC01A
- XE88LC02 (with display drivers)
- XE88LC05A (with DAC)

For RF interfacing:

- XE88LC06A
- XE88LC07A

== Typical target applications ==
- Sensor interface
- 4-20 mA current loop
- Battery supplied devices
- RF interface
