= Intel MCS-296 =

The Intel MCS-296 is a family of microcontrollers (MCU), an improved version of the Intel MCS-96, while remaining compatible. The family is often referred to as the 80296. The MCU has improved math performance making it practical in embedded digital signal processing (DSP) and feedback control systems. It can perform 12.5 DSP MIPS and general performance MIPS.

The main features of the MCS-296 family is 50 MHz operation, MCS-96 compatibility, pipeline architecture, 6 MB addressable space, 2 KB code/data RAM, 40-bit accumulator, fast hardware multiplier and accumulator, and 512 Byte register RAM.
