= Routing in cellular networks =

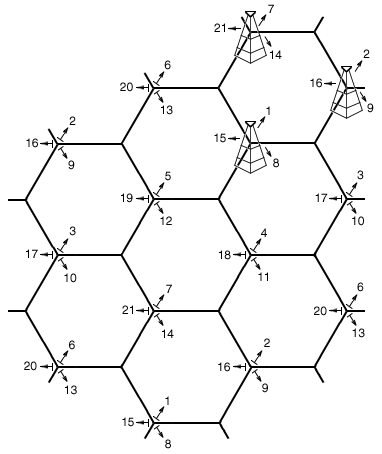
Cell sites frequency reuse pattern in Cellular telephone network . See U.S. patent 4,144,411

Network routing in a cellular network deals with the challenges of traditional telephony such as switching and call setup.

Most cellular network routing issues in different cells can be attributed to the multiple access methods used for transmission. The location of each mobile phone must be known to reuse a given band of frequencies in different cells and forms space-division multiple access (SDMA).

== Networks ==
FDMA is one of the multiple access methods used in cellular networks. 50 MHz blocks of communication channel are assigned, which lie in radio frequency range and contain an equal number of uplinks (terminal to base station) and downlinks (base station to terminal). One or more bidirectional channels are carried by 10-90 band pairs. The digital networks additionally make use of either CDMA or TDMA methods.

A special service called mobility management provides handover and roaming. Terminals (handsets) can move from one place to another during the call and require calls to be handed over from one channel to another. Soft handover uses the same frequency channel. The same terminals can operate in the same area covered by different service providers, which is known as roaming.
