= OpenPOWER Foundation =

Industry organization that manages Power ISA

- Predecessor: Power.org
- Formation: August 6, 2013; 13 years ago
- Founders: IBM, Google, Mellanox, NVIDIA, Tyan
- Purpose: Development and licensing of the Power ISA
- Members: > 350 members (as of July 2020)
- Key people: Ganesan Narayanasamy (president); James Kulina (executive director)
- Parent organization: Linux Foundation
- Website: openpowerfoundation.org

The OpenPOWER Foundation is a collaboration around Power ISA-based products initiated by IBM and announced as the "OpenPOWER Consortium" on August 6, 2013. IBM said it would open up technology surrounding its Power Architecture offerings, such as processor specifications, firmware, and software, for licensing, and use a collaborative development model with its partners, while keeping control of the Power instruction set.

The stated goal was to enable the server vendor ecosystem to build its own customized server, networking, and storage hardware for data centers and cloud computing.

Since August 2019, the governing body for the Power ISA instruction set has been the OpenPOWER Foundation, and IBM allows its patents to be used royalty-free for compliant implementations. Processors based on IBM's IP can be fabricated at foundries other than IBM's and combined with other hardware of the integrator's choice.

On August 20, 2019, IBM announced that the OpenPOWER Foundation would become part of the Linux Foundation.

== Openness ==
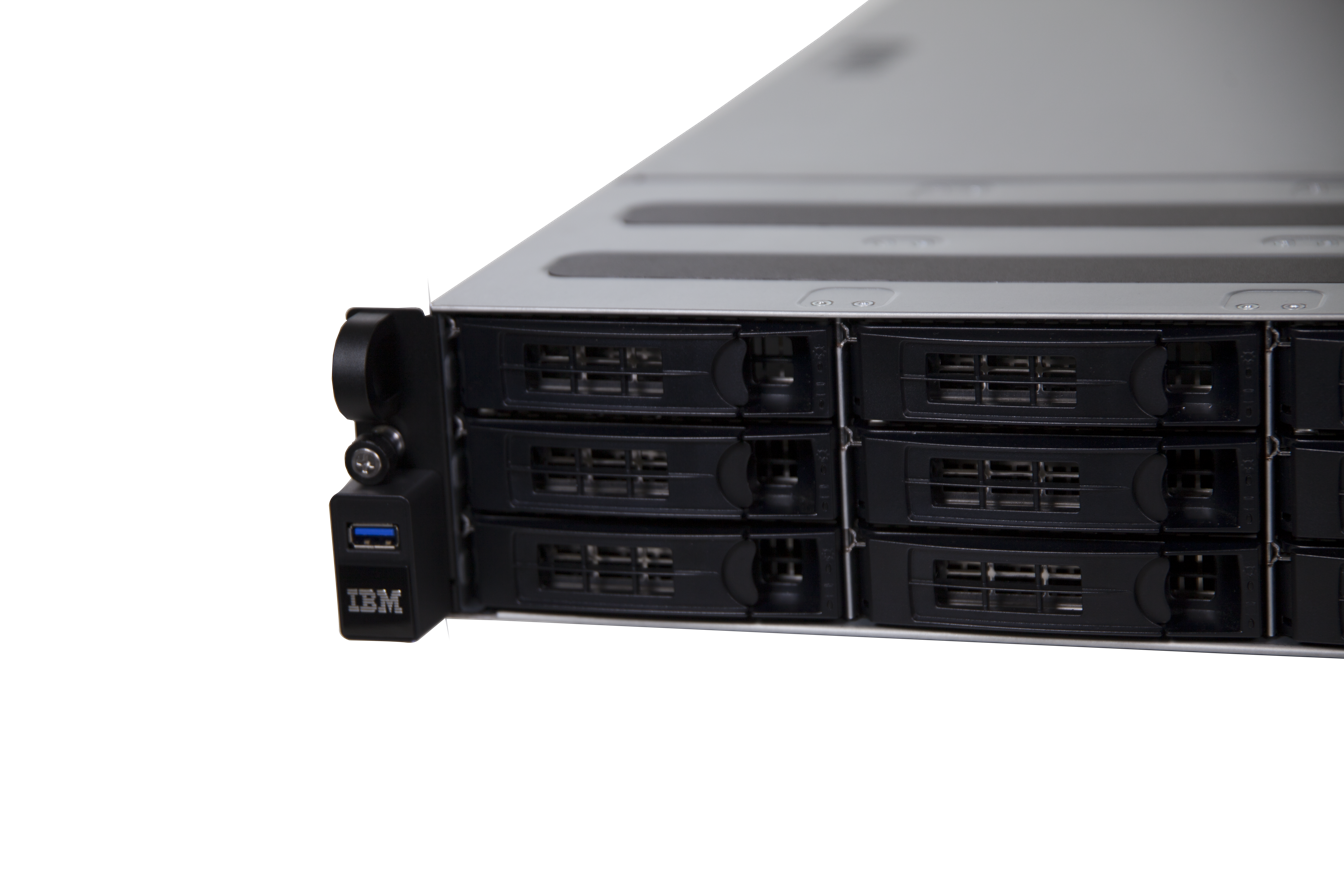
IBM S812LC – Habanero – Tyan manufactured OpenPOWER system

IBM described the project as "open" in three ways:

1. IBM would license the microprocessor technology openly: licensees could see the blueprints for the processor and its software, and hire IBM or other companies to manufacture processors or other related chips.
2. Members would follow an open-collaboration business model, sharing innovations with each other and collaborating on development projects.
3. The initiative would use open-source software such as the Linux operating system.

== Power Architecture ==
OpenPower Foundation also releases Documentation on the Power Architecture.

Some relevant documents are the Power ISA and Power Architecture Platform Reference.

== Hardware ==
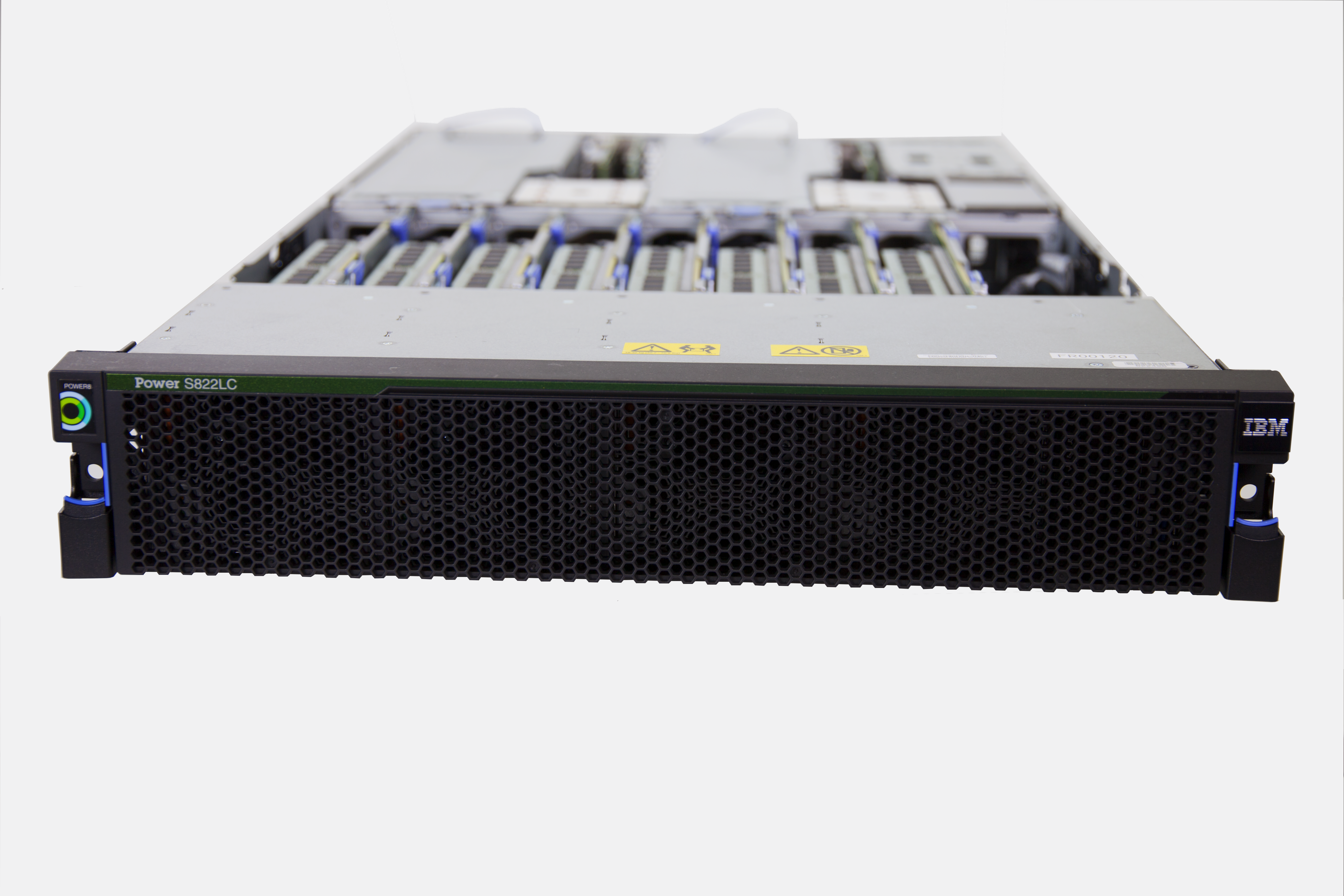
IBM S822LC – Firestone – Wistron manufactured OpenPOWER system

At launch, IBM said it would offer the POWER8 chip technology and later iterations under the OpenPOWER initiative, and that earlier designs were also available for licensing. Partners are required to contribute intellectual property to the OpenPOWER Foundation to be able to gain high level status.

The POWER8 processor architecture includes facilities for integration into custom designs. Its memory controllers are generic, intended to support future memory technologies. Its CAPI (Coherent Accelerator Processor Interface) expansion bus provides coherent memory addressing for the processor and external coprocessors such as GPUs, ASICs and FPGAs.

Nvidia announced it would contribute its interconnect technology, NVLink, intended to connect Nvidia's Pascal-based graphics processors to POWER processors.

=== Open source ===
In August 2019, IBM released the Microwatt processor core, a basic single-issue, in-order implementation of the Power ISA v.3.0 intended as a reference design for OpenPOWER. It is open source and published on GitHub. Later, Chiselwatt joined in as a second open source implementation.

In June 2020, IBM released the A2I core under a similar open source license and followed up with the A2O core in September 2020.

At the OpenPOWER Summit NA 2020, the Libre-SOC project presented its plans for a fully open-source hybrid CPU/GPU based on the OpenPOWER ISA. It adhered to the Power ISA 3.0 instruction set and could be run on field-programmable gate array boards. In a mailing list message dated June 23, 2024, project lead Luke Kenneth Casson Leighton described the project as "effectively terminated".

== Software ==
At launch, the OpenPOWER initiative was to include firmware, the KVM hypervisor, and little endian Linux operating system. The foundation has a site on GitHub for the software it releases as open source. By July 2014, it had released firmware to boot Linux.

SUSE included support for Power8 in their enterprise Linux distribution SUSE Linux Enterprise Server version 12 (release 27 October 2014).

Canonical Ltd. supports the architecture in Ubuntu Server from version 16.04 LTS.

FreeBSD has also been reported to have preliminary support for the architecture.

Collabora Online, an online office suite based on LibreOffice, announced support for the OpenPOWER ppc64le architecture in October 2022. Collabora provided Ubuntu 20.04 packages and Docker images for the architecture, and the German provider 21unity offered it with Nextcloud Enterprise on its OpenPOWER-based cloud.

== Members ==
Google, Tyan, Nvidia, and Mellanox are founding members of the OpenPOWER Foundation. At launch, Nvidia planned to pair its graphics processors with Power processors, and Mellanox to integrate its server adapters with Power chips. Tyan was reported to be working on servers using POWER8 and Google said the consortium had "the potential to establish Power architecture as a viable option" for applications in its data centers. Altera announced support for OpenPOWER in November 2013 with their FPGA offerings and OpenCL software.

On January 19, 2014, the Suzhou PowerCore Technology Company and the Research Institute of Jiangsu Industrial Technology announced that they will join the OpenPOWER Foundation and license POWER8 technologies to promote and help build systems around and design custom made processors for use in big data and cloud computing applications. On February 12, 2014, Samsung Electronics joined. As of March 2014, additional members are Altera, Fusion-io, Hynix, Micron, Servergy, and Xilinx. As of April 2014, Canonical, Chuanghe Mobile, Emulex, Hitachi, Inspur, Jülich Research Centre, Oregon State University, Teamsun, Unisource Technology Inc, and ZTE are listed as members at various levels. As of December 2014, Rackspace, Avnet, Lawrence Livermore National Laboratory, Sandia National Laboratories, Tsinghua University, Nallatech, Bull, QLogic, and Bloombase have joined, totaling about 80 members.

At the first annual OpenPOWER Summit 2015, the organization announced that there were 113 members, including Wistron, Cirrascale, and PMC-Sierra.

By late 2016, the OpenPOWER Foundation had more than 250 members.

As of July 2020, the OpenPOWER Foundation reported that it had 350-plus members.

== Reception ==
In 2020, HPCwire wrote that building an ecosystem had proved hard, that IBM being the only Power chip supplier sometimes made OpenPOWER "seem like just another IBM venture" (a view it called "probably unfair"), and that after "insufficient market traction" IBM appeared to be deemphasizing its bet on OpenPOWER. IBM's Power10 processors need closed-source firmware for memory and PCI Express, which The Register reported in 2022 left Raptor Computing Systems, a maker of POWER workstations with fully open firmware, unable to adopt them.

== See also ==
- IBM OpenPower – a line of POWER5 based Power Systems machines running Linux
- PowerOpen Environment
- List of open-source hardware projects
- Open Compute Project
- OpenBMC
- OpenSPARC
