= CoreConnect =

Microprocessor architecture

CoreConnect is a microprocessor bus-architecture from IBM for system-on-a-chip (SoC) designs. It was designed to ease the integration and reuse of processor, system, and peripheral cores within standard and custom SoC designs. As a standard SoC design point, it serves as the foundation of IBM or non-IBM devices. Elements of this architecture include the processor local bus (PLB), the on-chip peripheral bus (OPB), a bus bridge, and a device control register (DCR) bus. High-performance peripherals connect to the high-bandwidth, low-latency PLB. Slower peripheral cores connect to the OPB, which reduces traffic on the PLB. CoreConnect has bridging capabilities to the competing AMBA bus architecture, allowing reuse of existing SoC-components.

IBM makes the CoreConnect bus available as a no-fee, no-royalty architecture to tool-vendors, core IP-companies, and chip-development companies. As such it is licensed by over 1500 electronics companies such as Cadence, Ericsson, Lucent, Nokia, Siemens and Synopsys.

The CoreConnect is an integral part of IBM's embedded offerings and is used extensively in their PowerPC 4x0 based designs. In the past, Xilinx was using CoreConnect as the infrastructure for all of their embedded processor designs.

== Processor Local Bus (PLB) ==
- General processor local bus
- Synchronous, nonmultiplexed bus
- Separate Read, Write data buses
- Supports concurrent Read, Writes
- Multimaster, programmable-priority, arbitrated bus
- 32-bit up to 64-bit address
- 32-/64-/128-bit implementations (to 256-bit)
- 66/133/183 MHz (32-/64-/128-bit)
- Pipelined, supports early split transactions
- Overlapped arbitration (last cycle)
- Supports fixed, variable-length bursts
- Bus locking
- High bandwidth capabilities, up to 2.9 GB/s.

== On-chip Peripheral Bus (OPB) ==
- Peripheral bus for slower devices
- Synchronous, nonmultiplexed bus
- Multimaster, arbitrated bus
- Up to a 64-bit address bus
- Separate 32-bit Read, Write buses
- Pipelined transactions
- Overlapped arbitration (last cycle)
- Supports bursts
- Dynamic bus sizing, 8-, 16-, 32-bit devices
- Single-cycle data transfers
- Bus locking (parking)

== Device Control Register (DCR) bus ==
This bus:

- provides fully synchronous movement of GPR data between CPU and slave logic
- functions as a synchronous, nonmultiplexed bus
- has separate buses to read and to write data
- consists of a single-master, multiple-slave bus
- includes a 10-bit address bus
- features 32-bit data buses
- uses two-cycle minimum Read/Write cycles
- utilizes distributed multiplexer architecture
- supports 8-, 16-, and 32-bit devices
- performs single-cycle data transfers
