= CPF =

CPF may refer to:

== Economics ==
- Consumption–possibility frontier, a graph that shows the different quantities of two goods to which an economy has access for consumption
- Cobb–Douglas production function, widely used in economics to represent the relationship of an output to inputs

== Organizations ==
- Charoen Pokphand Foods, the agribusiness sector of the diversified agribusiness conglomerate Charoen Pokphand in Thailand
- Cherokee Preservation Foundation, a nonprofit foundation founded as part of the Tribal-State Compact amendment between the Eastern Band of Cherokee Indians (EBCI) and the State of North Carolina
- City Parochial Foundation, a charity in London, England
- Coalition for Patent Fairness, a group of companies who are lobbying for reforms to the United States patent system
- Collaborative Partnership on Forests
- Centre for People's Forestry, an NGO in Hyderabad, India

== People ==
- Charles Patrick Fitzgerald (1902–1992), British-Australian professor of East Asian studies with particular focus on China
- Claus Peter Flor (born 1953), German conductor. He played the violin as a youth, and later was a conducting student with Rolf Reuter
- Cristiano Pereira Figueiredo (born 1990), Portuguese footballer who plays as a goalkeeper for F.C. Vizela on loan from Sporting de Braga

== Politics and government ==
- Canada Periodical Fund, since 2020 how the government subsidizes journalists in the daily press
- Cadastro de Pessoas Físicas (Portuguese for 'Physical Persons Register'), an identity number for individuals issued by the Brazilian government
- Central Provident Fund, the mandatory saving and social security plan of Singapore
- Communist Party of Finland, a communist political party in Finland. The SKP was a section of Comintern and illegal in Finland until 1944
- Swedish Civil Administration's Employees' Union, a former Swedish trade union
- USC Center for the Political Future, a non-partisan center at the University of Southern California, that was established to combat uncivil political discourse and promote bipartisan, fact-based dialogue on national issues

== Science and technology ==
- Closed-cone pine forest, a plant community of coastal California and several offshore islands that consists of stands of Bishop Pines
- Central place foraging, evolutionary ecology model
- Common Power Format, a file format for specifying power-saving techniques early in the design process for integrated circuits
- Corky-stemmed passion flower, common name for Passiflora suberosa, a species of passion flower that is native to the Americas
- Control Program Facility, the operating system of the IBM System/38 minicomputer

== Transportation ==
- Church Point Ferry, provides ferry services from Church Point, situated on Pittwater in the northern suburbs of Sydney, New South Wales, Australia
- Canadian Patrol Frigate, such as the Halifax-class frigate
- Ngloram Airport, Indonesia (ICAO code CPF)

== Other uses ==
- CPF Building, a high-rise skyscraper located in the central business district of Singapore
- Controlled permeability formwork, a durability enhancing formliner used in construction
