= OCP =

OCP may refer to:

== Arts and entertainment ==
- OCP (film), a 2013 performance video project
- Omni Consumer Products (RoboCop), a fictional corporation in the RoboCop franchise
  - Omni Consumer Products (company), a manufacturer of film-inspired items, founded 2006
- Opera Company of Philadelphia, founded 1975
- Oregon Catholic Press, a publisher of liturgical music, founded 1922
- Outside Context Problem, a concept in Iain M. Banks's The Culture novels
- Portuguese Chamber Orchestra, founded 2007

== Military and politics ==
- Official community plan, of Canadian municipalities
- One-child policy, of China
- Operational Camouflage Pattern, of the U.S. military

== Science and technology ==
=== Biology and medicine ===
- Ocular cicatricial pemphigoid or mucous membrane pemphigoid
- Onchocerciasis Control Programme, a global effort to control the disease onchocerciasis
- Oral contraceptive pill, in birth control
- Orange carotenoid protein, involved in photoprotection against light stress in diverse cyanobacteria
- Overall coagulation potential, a parameter of the overall hemostasis potential test

=== Computing ===
- Open Compute Project, a design for scale-out data centers
- Open Core Protocol, a protocol for on-chip subsystem communications
- Order code processor, the central processing unit in ICL 2900 and other computers
- Open–closed principle, in object-oriented programming
- Open Container Project, application containers for ease of portability
- OpenShift Container Platform, an on-premises version of OpenShift from Red Hat
- Oracle Certified Professional, a designation of the Oracle Certification Program
- Oxford Concordance Program, text analysis software

=== Other science and technology ===
- Octacalcium phosphate, a biomineral precursor chemical
- Open-circuit potential, an electric potential measured at zero net current
- Overcurrent protection, in power supply
- Optimal control problem, in applied mathematics and engineering
- Organochlorine pesticides, a family of organochlorine compounds to which the DDT insecticide belongs

== Other uses ==
- OCP Group, a Moroccan phosphate mining/processing company
- Obligatory contour principle, in linguistics
- Ocean Park station (station code), an MTR station in Hong Kong
- Ochre Coloured Pottery culture, a Bronze Age culture in the Yamuna-Ganga region of India
- Optional cash purchase, in dividend reinvestment plan
- Okapi Conservation Project, a wildlife conservation organization focused on okapis

== See also ==
- Open Core Protocol International Partnership Association
