= SBA =

SBA may refer to:

== Computing ==
- Search-based application
- Space-based architecture
- Simple Bus Architecture, an architecture for the SoC implementation based in VHDL
- sba, sparse bundle adjustment software

== Healthcare ==
- Skilled birth attendant, a health care practitioner in childbirth care

== Organizations and institutions ==
- SBA Communications, communications structures company in America
- Sergeants Benevolent Association of NYPD
- Singapore Badminton Association
- Small Business Administration
- Sport Boys Association, a Peruvian football (soccer) club
- Saint Benedict at Auburndale, a Catholic school in Cordova, Tennessee
- State Board of Administration of Florida
- Student bar association
- Steam Boat Association of Great Britain
- SoloBird Academy

== Transportation ==
- Brewster SBA, naval attack aircraft
- SBA Airlines
- Santa Barbara Airport, FAA airport identifier code SBA
- Santa Barbara station, Amtrak station code SBA

== Other uses ==
- SAFE Banking Act
- Susan B. Anthony, American political activist
- School-based assessment, component of Hong Kong Diploma of Secondary Education
- Sharks Billiards Association, professional nine-ball league in the Philippines
- Short backfire antenna
- Simulation Based Acquisition
- Small Business Act for Europe
- Sovereign Base Areas
- Soybean agglutinin, a soybean lectin antinutrient
- Sports Broadcasting Act of 1961, a U.S. federal law
- Structure-based assignment
- Swachh Bharat Abhiyan, the "Clean India Mission" which began in 2014
- Smarter Balanced Assessment Consortium, a standardized test
