= DASC =

DASC may refer to:

- Design Automation Standards Committee
- Direct Air Support Center
- Digital Active Signal Collector
