= Si2 =

SI2 may refer to:

- Silicon Integration Initiative
- Storm from the Shadows, the second book in David Weber's Saganami Island series.
- SI_{2}, a grade of diamond clarity
- Solar Impulse 2, 2nd generation solar powered plane
