= OVL =

OVL may refer to:

- OVL (file format)
- Lobaev Sniper Rifle
- Overlay (programming)
- Open Verification Library
