= Open Core Protocol =

The Open Core Protocol (OCP) is a protocol for on-chip subsystem communications. It is an openly licensed, core-centric protocol and defines a bus-independent, configurable interface. OCP International Partnership (OCP-IP) produces OCP specifications. OCP data transfer models range from simple request-grant handshaking through pipelined request-response to complex out-of-order operations.

Legacy IP cores can be adapted to OCP, while new implementations may take advantage of advanced features: designers select only those features and signals encompassing a core's specific data, control and test configuration.

The Open Core Protocol (OCP) is one of several FPGA processor interconnects used to connect soft FPGA peripherals to FPGA CPUs—both soft microprocessor and hard-macro processor. Other such interconnects include Advanced eXtensible Interface (AXI), Avalon, and the Wishbone bus.

FPGA vendor Altera joined the Open Core Protocol International Partnership in 2010.

== Advantages ==
- Eliminates the ongoing task of interface protocol (re)definition, verification, documentation and support
- Readily adapts to support new core capabilities
- Test bench portability simplifies (re)verification
- Limits test suite modifications for core enhancements
- Interfaces to any bus structure or on-chip network
- Delivers industry-standard flexibility and reuse
- Point-to-point protocol can directly interface two cores

== Disadvantages ==
- Neither Altera nor Xilinx, the two largest FPGA vendors, supports this protocol.
