= Independent enquiry study =

Independent Enquiry Study (IES; Chinese: 獨立專題探究), which is adopted as the school-based assessment (SBA), counting as 20% of students’ total result in Liberal Studies and sharing one-third of teaching hours, is a compulsory public examination component of the Hong Kong Diploma of Secondary Education (HKDSE) offered by Hong Kong Examinations and Assessment Authority (HKEAA) since 2009. Students are requested to complete an individual project in written (between 1,500 and 4,000 words) or non-written form and either in Chinese or English based on the Liberal Studies Curriculum. With the aims of enhancing students to be ‘independent’ and ‘self-directed’ learners, the project requires students to integrate knowledge, concepts and skills and analyze their issues from multiple perspectives in the study.

== Content ==
The Independent Enquiry Study (IES) is divided into three parts : Project proposal, Data collection and Product . Students are required to choose a topic on their own which is specific and feasible enough for study . After setting up the topic and title, students can start the learning and study process through the collection of useful and helpful data by various ways, such as questionnaire, interview, observation, survey etc. During the process of collection of data, students are required to perform their skill of data analysis in multiple perspectives and the record the result of data they have collected .

After all, when it comes to the final products, students are required to hand in their final products in two forms : written and non-written forms . For written forms, students need to hand in all the materials and data they have collected with the learning reflection in their final products in 1,500 and 4,000 words. For non-written form, students need to present their final products to their teacher in the class using powerpoint with diagrams which can help them to present their data and topic .

== Marks Allocation ==
IES contributes to 20% of the final score of Liberal Studies in HKDSE. There are three types of assessments, including ‘Process’, ‘Project Proposal’ and ‘Product’. Each stage consists of nine marks.

For ‘Process’, students are tested on their content, independent thinking, communication skills and effort. In ‘Project Proposal’ stage, students getting high marks require to define the issue well, collect relevant information, use appropriate concepts and develop a comprehensive plan (P.39). ‘Product’ stage assesses students’ performances of providing data, findings, new ideas, suggestions and reflections.

== Moderation of IES score in the HKDSE ==
According to Hong Kong Examinations and Assessment Authority (2010), moderation guarantees the comparability of assessment standards and scores across schools and from year to year. It determinates the performance levels of individual students and also schools compared to the other students in the same school and other schools by statistical moderation and expert judgement moderation. Statistical moderation uses students’ scores in the public examination as reference and analyses the samples sent by the schools. Expert judgement moderation adjusts group performance level with reference to review of samples of students’ work, assisted with statistical techniques(P.10).

== Intended Learning Outcomes ==
Developing student's higher-order thinking and communication skills

 After completing The Independent Enquiry Study, students will be able to analyze appropriate findings from various perspectives or stakeholders related to the concerned topic.

Developing student's a sense of exploration, discovery and independent thinking

 In IES, students are required to collect greatly practical data in the assessment of “ Data collection’’.[3] As a result, students will be able to classify and deploy the data and construct their own ideas after this process.   

Generalizing feasible solutions and outcomes in a structured way

 When compiling the assessment of “Product’’, students should construct fruitful opinions with reasonable arguments and well-supported reflections.[3] Therefore, students will be able to develop effective solutions and appraise the learning progress.     

Demonstrating the use of hypotheses and focus questions in studying an issue

 For the assessment of “Project Proposal’’, students should hypothesize the foreseeable implications and questions they focused for the inquiry.[3] They will be able to generate plans for writing by hypotheses and focus questions consequently.

Broadening their horizons

As regard to IES, it aims to explore knowledge of an issue, which affects our society and the world. Students will be able to demonstrate knowledge in the study of Liberal Art through researching different perspectives of an issue.[3] Moreover, they would be likely to widen their horizons.

Catering for student's interest and inclination

 Every student should design their own topics, methodology and scope by themselves. It provides an opportunity for them to be self-reliant learners.[3] Thus, they will be able to set plans, systemize the plans and dealing with problems.

Preparing students for lifelong learning and challenges

 Whichever topics are used, students will be able to understand the influence of social, national and global changes and its implications.[3] The duration of IES gives students longer consideration to analysis the inquiry which cannot be easily accessed by conventional written examination.

== Arguments of Cancelling IES ==
Some students and schools have doubts about the teaching value of the IES. Some students even claim that they are suffering from the IES. The IES contributes to 20% of the final score of Liberal Studies in HKDSE, which will not affect the final score of the student as a whole subject. However, students needed to spend their whole senior secondary school life which may take them 3 years to deal with the IES in order to guarantee this 20% of marks. Students and teachers are complaining because it is time-consuming and it is too difficult for a secondary school student. Therefore, some people suggested to cancel the IES for the students best interest. After the major review in April 2014, a new guideline has been introduced which will help students to compete their IES in a “more focused manner”. In another word, the IES will be easier for students starting from September 2014. However, the Hong Kong Examinations and Assessment Authority still has no plan on cancelling the IES as students and teachers wanted to.
