= 334 Scheme =

Academic structure for senior secondary education and higher education in Hong Kong

The 3-3-4 Scheme is the academic structure for senior secondary education and higher education in Hong Kong, referring to the structure of three years of junior secondary school, three years of senior secondary school, and four years of university education.

The programme replaced the British 3-2-2-3 system (three years of junior secondary school, two years of senior secondary school, two years of matriculation course and three years of university education). This scheme began in the 2009 school year. By 2012, HKDSE had replaced HKCEE (O Level) and HKALE (A Level).

== Curriculum ==
Core subjects are Chinese language, English language, mathematics and liberal studies, along with three elective subjects. It is different from the old curriculum in that pupils now receive three years of senior secondary education and four years of university education. To move to university education, students must pass all four core subjects in the Hong Kong Diploma of Secondary Education.

As a result, there is no more need for a genuine sixth form college. The first and only such college in Hong Kong, PLK Vicwood KT Chong Sixth Form College, changed to being largely a senior secondary college.

== Advantages ==
- The incorporation of Liberal Studies as a new core subject of the certificate, alongside Chinese, English and Mathematics), targeted to raise students' awareness of world issues and political matters, develop critical and logical reasoning, and experience research processes of data gathering, sifting and analysis through an independent research project, known as IES (Independent Enquiry Studies).

== Disadvantages ==
- The change in format was an added burden for teachers and students in the transition cohorts.
- Liberal Studies is a new subject, requiring additional training for teachers.
- With the combination of the two public exams into one, there is no longer a first exam to act as a filter. The wide range in the competency among students makes designing the new papers becomes more difficult.
- The exams, first sat in 2012, were considerably easier than internationally accepted exams such as the IB Diploma. Many often achieve high marks. Questions such as "Name five cities mentioned in the magazine article" appeared in the English exam. The history course has been criticised as too easy with 50% of the grade is based on data analysis, which requires little historical knowledge. Others claim that the data-based questions also require candidates to make use of their background knowledge to make sense of the data provided and to express views over controversial statements, as they do in answering the essay-type questions.
