= Controlled permeability formwork =

Method used in concrete casting

Controlled Permeability Formwork (CPF) is a system proven to significantly enhance the durability of surface concrete during the casting process.

== The need for CPF ==
All concretes cast against wood or steel in the concrete cover zone, have a reduced cement content and increased water/cement ratio (i.e. less dense and more porous) compared to concrete located beyond the reinforcement. Within the core of any structural element the matrix is generally a denser and of better quality compared to the surface as a direct result of the concrete compaction. This compaction process drives excess mix air and water within the cover zone towards the formed surfaces.

As conventional wood or steel formwork is impermeable, the migration within the mix ceases as the concrete/formwork interface is reached. Visually, this may be observed on all concrete surfaces through the presence of blowholes following formwork removal.

This is a problem because the first line of defence of all structural elements against carbonatation, chlorides, frost and abrasion, is the cover zone. It is therefore imperative this region is durable.

== CPF liners ==
CPF liners are typically constructed of 100% polypropylene fibres, spun and thermally bonded, with a woven texture of 0.7 mm thickness. Some systems may be laminated to a plastic latticed net to ensure drainage whilst providing stiffness to the liner.

They are robust and chemically inert and may be supplied in rolls of varying length to construction sites.

== Basic elements of CPF systems ==
The basic elements of CPF systems are:

- Filter - to allow the passage of water and air away from the fresh concrete but retain cement and other fine solids.
- Drain - which transfers air and water from the filter to outside the formwork.
- Structural support - this is the formwork which supports the filter and drainage elements and also maintains the required formwork profile and resists the concrete pressure, commonly plywood/structural timber.

== How cpf liners work ==
CPF liners are secured in place on vertical or inclined surfaces with staples or other fixing devices, having first been tensioned onto the formwork shuttering. Once attached, concreting is performed in the normal way. Release agents are not required as CPF liners easily debond from the concrete during formwork striking.

Throughout the concreting process and as a result of concrete pressures, entrapped air and excess mix water that would otherwise become trapped at the surface causing blemishes, can instead pass through the liner. A proportion of this mix water is held within the liner and under capillary action, imbibes back into the concrete to assist curing. Liners generally have a pore structure that is designed to retain the majority of cement and other small fines.

This results (for vertical and inclined surfaces) in the creation of a uniform surface relatively free from blowholes and other surface blemishes when compared to impermeable concrete. But more importantly the achievement of a cover area with significantly enhanced durability.

== Articles, papers and reports on CPF ==
- Anon., Liner that lets it breathe, Building, 14 February 1992, p. 47.
- Anon., Formwork methods and systems, Concrete, July 1990, Vol 24, No 7, pp. 21–24.
- Anon., Mersey overflows with quality concrete, Concrete, March/April 1994, p. 32.
- Anon., Concrete in war against germs, Concrete, January/February, 1995, p. 19.
- Anon., Zemdrain is new Broom, Concrete, January/February, 1995, p. 51.
- Anon., The River Dee Estuary Bridge, Concrete, May/June, 1996, pp. 8–10.
- Anon., Zemdrain is awarded BBA Certificate, Concrete, May/June, 1996, p. 47.
- Anon., Liner comes first in protection test, Construction Weekly, 12 February 1992.
- Anon., Liner does well in surface tests, Construction Weekly, 1 September 1993.
- Anon., Stopping the rot before it begins. Highways, July 1993, pp. 6, 9.
- Anon., Permeable forms show promise. New Civil Engineer, 20 June 1991, p. 8.
- Annie Peter, J. and Chitharanjan, N. Evaluation of indigenous filter fabrics for use in Controlled Permeable Formwork, Indian Concrete Journal April 1995, pp. 215–219.
- Bamforth, P.B. and Price, W.F. Factors influencing chloride ingress into marine structures. Proceedings of the International Conference, Concrete 2000, Economic and Durable Construction Through Excellence, Vol 2, E & F N Spon, London, September, 1993, pp. 1105–1118.
- Barfoot, J. Heavily-anchored retaining walls on Okehampton Bypass. Concrete, February, 1988, pp. 24–26.
- Barfoot, J. Controlled Permeability Formwork. Concrete, March/April, 1991, pp. 12–13
- Basheer, P.A.M. and Rankin, G.I.B. In-situ evaluation of surface properties cast using Zemdrain formwork liner at Dock street bridge, Belfast. Internal report to Du pont De Nemours, Luxembourg, Report No - TAS 131, April, 1992, p. 10, (Unpublished).
- Basheer, P.A.M, Sha’at, A.A, Long, A.E. and Montgomery, F.R. Influence of Controlled Permeability Formwork on the durability of concrete. Proceedings of the International Conference, Concrete 2000, Economic and Durable Construction Through Excellence, Vol 1, E & F N Spon, London, September, 1993, pp. 737–748.
- Basheer, P.A.M, Sha’at, A.A, Long, A.E. Controlled Permeability Formwork: Influence on carbonation and chloride ingress in concrete. Proceedings of Concrete under Severe Conditions, Environment and loading, Vol. 2, (Ed K Sakai, N Banthia and O E Gjorv), E & F N Spon, 1995, pp. 1205–1215.
- British Cement Association. BCA investigates Hybrid permanent formwork. BCA bulletin Issue No. 13, February 1992, p. 3.
- Department of Trade and Industry. Controlled Permeability Formwork, paper No.8, formwork practice in Japan. Report on an overseas Science and Technology Expert Mission, London, October 1989, pp. 29–32.
- Duggan, T. Enhancing concrete durability using Controlled Permeability Formwork. 17th Conference on Our World in Concrete and Structures, Singapore, August, 1992. pp. 57–62.
- Du Pont De Nemours. Formwork liner for long life concrete, Concrete May/June 1992
- Harrison, T.A. Hi-tech concrete leads Japanese dam bids. New Civil Engineer, 1 February 1990, p. 22.
- Harrison, T.A. Introducing Controlled Permeability Formwork. Concrete Quarterly, British Cement Association, Summer 1990, pp. 6–7.
- Harrison, T.A. Introducing Controlled Permeability Formwork. Increase concrete durability in the cover zone, Concrete Construction, Vol. 36, No. 2, 1991, pp. 198–202.
- Jaung, J.D., Harai, K. and Mihashi, H. Improvement of concrete properties related to durability by means of permeable forms; In “Quality control of concrete structures”, Proceedings of the 2nd International Symposium, 12–14 June, Ghent, Spon, London, pp. 287–296.
- Kasai, Y., Motoshi, N., Sato, K. And Suga, K. Study on the evaluation of concrete quality prepared with permeable forms and plywood forms. Transactions of the Japan Concrete Institute, Vol 10, 1988, pp. 59–66.
- Kasai, Y., Nagano, M., Sato, K. and Motoshi, N. Comparison of cement contents of concrete surface prepared in permeable form and conventional form; Cement Association of Japan, Review of the 42nd General Meeting, Technical Session, Tokyo, May, 1988, pp. 298–301.
- Lamberton, B.A. Fabric forms for concrete, Concrete International, December 1989, pp. 58–67.
- Long, A.E., Basheer, P.A.M. and Callahan, A. Controlled Permeability Formwork. Construction Repair Magazine, November–December, 1992, pp. 36–40.
- Long, A.E. Selected results based on laboratory tests on Zemdrain. Internal report for Queen’s University, Belfast, Undated.
- Long, A.E., Sha’at, A.A. and Basheer, P.A.M. The influence of Controlled Permeability Formwork on the Durability and Transport Properties of Near Surface Concrete. ACI, SP,154-3, 1995, pp. 41–54.
- Long, A. E., A. A. Sha'at, F. R. Montgomery and P. A. M. Basheer, "A controlled permeability formwork – its influence on chloride ingress in concrete under various environmental conditions", Proceedings of Conference on Structural Materials in Marine Environments, The Royal Society, London, Eds:, Vol. The Institute of Materials, 1994, 11-12 May, pp 289-309
- Long, A.E., Basheer, P.A.M., Brady, P. and McCauley, A. A Comparative study of three types of Controlled Permeability Formwork liners. Proceedings of the International conference Concrete in the Service of Mankind, University of Dundee, 24–28 June 1996, pp. 273–280.
- Montgomery, F. R., A. A. Sha'at and P. A. M. Basheer, "A controlled permeability formwork liner - its effects onsurface absorption and permeability of concrete", Proceedings, 2nd International Conference on Inspection, Appraisal, Repairs and Maintenance of Building and Structures, Jakarta, Indonesia, Eds:, Vol. CI-Premier Conference, Singapore, 1992, 28-29 September, pp 137-141. OCLC 221303816
- Marosszeky, M., Chew, M., Arioka, M. and Peck, P. Textile method to improve concrete durability. Concrete International, November, 1993, pp. 37–42.
- Pallet, P.F. Controlled Permeability Formwork. British Cement Association report, September, 1993, p. 14.
- Price, W.F. The use of Zemdrain CPF on the resistance to chloride penetration of concretes exposed to salt spray condition in hot climates; Technical Report No. 1303/92/6335, Taywood Engineering Ltd, R&D Division, September, 1992,(unpublished).
- Price, W.F. The effect of Zemdrain Controlled Permeability Formwork on the frost resistance of concrete. Technical report. Taywood Engineering R&D, Report No - 1303/92/6349, October, 1992, p. 13, (unpublished).
- Price, W.F. The improvement of concrete durability using controlled permeability formwork. Proceedings of the 5th International Conference “Structural Faults Repairs, Vol 2, 1993, pp. 233–238.
- Price, W.F. Two examples of high performance concrete in practice, Part 2, Quality Concrete, May, 1995, pp. 127–130.
- Price, W.F. and Widdows, S.J. The effects of permeable formwork on the surface properties of concrete. Magazine of Concrete Research, Vol 43, No. 155, June, 1991, pp. 93–104.
- Price, W.F. and Widdows, S.J. Durability of concrete in hot climates: Benefits from permeable formwork, Proceedings of the 3rd International RILEM Symposium on Concrete in Hot Climates, (Ed M J Walker), Torquay, 21–24 September 1992, pp. 207–220.
- Rankin, G.I.B. In-situ evaluation of silane treated concrete cast using Zemdrain formwork liner at Dock street bridge, Belfast. Internal report to Du pont De Nemours, Luxembourg, Report No - TAS 139, June, 1992, p. 8, (Unpublished).
- Reddi, S.A. Permeable formwork for impermeable concrete. Indian Concrete Journal, January, 1992, pp. 31–35.
- Roper, H. Discussion on the paper The effects of permeable formwork on the surface properties of concrete by W.F. Price, and S.J.Widdows. Magazine of Concrete Research, Vol 45, No. 163, June, 1993, p. 155.
- Serafini, F.L. Corrosion protection of concrete using a Controlled Permeability Formwork (CPF) system; Proceedings of the International conference Corrosion and Corrosion Protection of Steel in Concrete (Ed R. Narayan Swamy), Sheffield, Vol. 2, 24–28 July 1994, pp. 1114–1131.
- Sha’at, A.A, Long, A.E., Montgomery, F.R. and Basheer, P.A.M. The influence of Controlled Permeability Formwork liner on the quality of cover concrete. ACI, SP, 139-6, 1993. pp. 91–105.
- Sha'at, A. A., A. E. Long, P. A. M. Basheer and F. R. Montgomery, "The influence of Zemdrain as a permeable formwork liner on the quality of cover concrete, Report for DuPont Nemours (Germany)", Report No. SMRG- 09-1992, Structural Materials Research Group, Department of Civil Engineering, The Queen's University of Belfast, Belfast, 1992, May, 83 pp
- Sha'at, A. A., A. E. Long, P. A. M. Basheer and F. R. Montgomery, "The influence of controlled permeability formwork on chloride ion penetration in concrete, Report to DuPont Nemours (Luxembourg)", Report No. SMRG-11-1993, Structural Materials Research Group, Department of Civil Engineering, The Queen's University of Belfast, Belfast, 1993, October, 14 pp
- Sha'at, A. A., P. A. M. Basheer, A. E. Long and F. R. Montgomery, "Reliability of the Accelerated Chloride Migration Test as a Measure of Chloride Diffusivity in Concrete", Proceedings, International Conference on Corrosion and Corrosion Protection of Steel in Concrete, University of Sheffield, Eds: R.N. Swamy, Vol. Sheffield Academic Press, 1994, 24-29 July, pp 446-460.
- Simons, A. Formwork an International Overview, Concrete March/April 1991, pp. 8–11.
- Sprigenschmidit, R. and Fleischer, W. Shutter liners for the improvement of near surface layer of concrete, Betonwerk + Fertigeil-technik (Concrete Precasting Plant and Technology), No 11, 1990, pp. 78–82.
- Tanaka, K. and Ikeda, H. Improvement of surface quality concrete structures by unique formwork, International Association for Bridge and Structural Engineering (IABSE) Symposium, Zurich, Vol 55, 1987, pp. 345–351.
- Wilson, D. Controlled Permeability Formwork (CPF), Concrete, March/April, 1994, pp. 20–22.
- Wilson, D. A review of the use of Controlled Permeability Formwork (CPF) systems; Proceedings of the International conference Corrosion and Corrosion Protection of Steel in Concrete (Ed R. Narayan Swamy), Vol. 2, Sheffield, 24–28 July 1994, pp. 1132–1141.
- Wilson. D. and Serafini. FL. Controlled Permeability Formwork, Proceedings of the International conference Concrete in the Service of Mankind, Vol 4, E & F N spon, London, 24–28 June 1996, pp. 281–290.
