= Centre for People's Forestry =

Indian civil society organisation

Centre for People's Forestry, India

Centre for People's Forestry is a civil society organisation in India, established in August 2002. CPF works for the rights and livelihoods of forest-dependent communities with due regard to conservation. It believes that the claim to conservation, control and management of the forest resources belong to the forest-dwelling and dependent communities and their livelihoods should be the primary concern of all forestry programmes.

CPF executes various projects in collaboration with various government agencies in India and many multinational groups such as:

- Ford Foundation
- Winrock International, India
- Oxfam - Novib
- UK India Education and Research Initiative (UKIERI)
- RECOFTC (Regional Community Forestry Training Centre for the Asia Pacific Region), Bangkok

CPF is built around five broad core areas:

- Forest rights and tenure security
- Capacity building and strengthening of forest-based communities
- Action research and policy advocacy
- Participatory SNRM and livelihoods
- Climate change, forests and carbon

== CPF studies ==
- Feasibility report Analysing Feasibility, Identifying markets and establishing linkages for Cashew (Srikakulam District), Turmeric and Long Pepper (Visakhapatnam district)
- A study on understanding the existing policy and implementation gaps with regards to the community forest rights and community the forest resource under forest rights act (2013)
- Forest Tenure Assessment in India (2011)
- A Study on Oilseed (2011)
- A study on participation of Forest Dependent Communities in Governance and developmental programmes of FDA under NAP (2011)
- Assessment of performance of VSSs in forest fringe watersheds (2011)
- A study on the community-based enterprise on Sal and karanj Seed Oil extraction (2010)
- Changes in Species Richness and Diversity of VSS forests of Andhra Pradesh (2010)
- Carbon stock estimation in Neelamputtu VSS forest Visakhapatnam Andhra Pradesh – A participatory approach (2010)
- A Study on NTFP-related livelihood dependency and people's perceptions (2009)
- Sustaining Adda leaf plate making activity by tribal women (2009)
- A comparative study of the performance of VSSs under the APCFM and FDA programmes in Andhra Pradesh (2009)
- A study on the socio-economic status of Chenchu people in Nagarjunsagar-Srisailam Tiger Reserve (2008)
- Reclamation of Grazing lands and the community-based management of fodder based agroforestry systems (2009)
- List of other Action Research Studies (2008)
- Monitoring by Stakeholders in Bhadrachalam Division of Andhra Pradesh, April 2004 - March 2005
- NTFP Collection & Sale - Monitoring by Stakeholders in Bhadrachalam Division of GCC (February - June 2004) Published in August 2004 in Telugu
- Study on VSS Sustainability and the role of GCC (NTFP Marketing) in connection with CFM in Andhra Pradesh (June 2003)
- Role of Women in NTFP (Collection and Marketing of Tamarind, Amla, Soanut in North Coastal Andhra Pradesh)
- Bamboo in VSSs OF Andhra Pradesh (Harvest, Marketing & Benefit Sharing)
