= Handshake (computing) =

Signal between two devices or programs

In computing, a handshake is a process in which two devices establish a communication link by authenticating and validating each other's signals. An example is the handshaking between a hypervisor and an application in a guest virtual machine.

In telecommunications, a handshake is an automated process of negotiation between two participants (example "Alice and Bob") through the exchange of information that establishes the protocols of a communication link at the start of the communication, before full communication begins. The handshaking process usually takes place in order to establish rules for communication when a computer attempts to communicate with another device. Signals are usually exchanged between two devices to establish a communication link. For example, when a computer communicates with another device such as a modem, the two devices will signal each other that they are switched on and ready to work, as well as to agree to which protocols are being used. Handshaking can negotiate parameters that are acceptable to equipment and systems at both ends of the communication channel, including information transfer rate, coding alphabet, parity, interrupt procedure, and other communication protocol or hardware features. Handshaking facilitates connecting relatively heterogeneous systems or equipment over a communication channel without the need for human intervention to set parameters.

Within TCP/IP RFCs, handshake is most commonly used to reference the TCP three-way handshake. For example, the term handshake is not present in RFCs covering FTP or SMTP. One exception is Transport Layer Security (TLS) setup, FTP RFC 4217. In place of the term handshake, FTP RFC 3659 substitutes the term conversation for the passing of commands.

A simple handshaking protocol might only involve the receiver sending a message meaning "I received your last message and I am ready for you to send me another one." A more complex handshaking protocol might allow the sender to ask the receiver if it is ready to receive or for the receiver to reply with a negative acknowledgement meaning "I did not receive your last message correctly, please resend it" (e.g., if the data was corrupted en route).

== Example ==
=== TCP three-way handshake ===
Example of three way handshaking

Establishing a normal TCP connection requires three separate steps:

1. The first host (Alice) sends the second host (Bob) a "synchronize" (SYN) message with its own sequence number $x$, which Bob receives.
2. Bob replies with a synchronize-acknowledgment (SYN-ACK) message with its own sequence number $y$ and acknowledgement number $x + 1$, which Alice receives.
3. Alice replies with an acknowledgement (ACK) message with acknowledgement number $y + 1$, which Bob receives and to which he doesn't need to reply.
In this setup, the synchronize messages act as service requests from one server to the other, while the acknowledgement messages return to the requesting server to let it know the message was received.

The reason for the client and server not using a default sequence number such as 0 for establishing the connection is to protect against two incarnations of the same connection reusing the same sequence number too soon, which means a segment from an earlier incarnation of a connection might interfere with a later incarnation of the connection.

=== SMTP ===
The Simple Mail Transfer Protocol (SMTP) is the key Internet standard for email transmission. It includes handshaking to negotiate authentication, encryption and maximum message size.

=== TLS handshake ===
When a Transport Layer Security (SSL or TLS) connection starts, the record encapsulates a "control" protocol—the handshake messaging protocol (content type 22). This protocol is used to exchange all the information required by both sides for the exchange of the actual application data by TLS. It defines the messages formatting or containing this information and the order of their exchange. These may vary according to the demands of the client and server—i.e., there are several possible procedures to set up the connection. This initial exchange results in a successful TLS connection (both parties ready to transfer application data with TLS) or an alert message (as specified below).

The protocol is used to negotiate the secure attributes of a session. (RFC 5246, p. 37)

=== WPA2 wireless ===
The WPA2 standard for wireless uses a four-way handshake defined in IEEE 802.11i-2004.

=== Dial-up access modems ===
One classic example of handshaking is that of dial-up modems, which typically negotiate communication parameters for a brief period when a connection is first established, and thereafter use those parameters to provide optimal information transfer over the channel as a function of its quality and capacity. The "squealing" (which is actually a sound that changes in pitch 100 times every second) noises made by some modems with speaker output immediately after a connection is established are in fact the sounds of modems at both ends engaging in a handshaking procedure; once the procedure is completed, the speaker might be silenced, depending on the settings of operating system or the application controlling the modem.

=== Serial "Hardware Handshaking" ===
This frequently used term describes the use of RTS and CTS signals over a serial interconnection. It is, however, not quite correct; it's not a true form of handshaking, and is better described as flow control.

=== Mobile device charging ===
In device chargers offering special quick-charge abilities to supported devices, the charging process will switch up to a higher output voltage for increased power transfer. But this could cause serious damage to an unsupported device or even result in a fire. It is therefore very important for the device and charger to first perform a handshake to "agree" on mutually supported charge parameters. If such a charger can't identify the connected device or determine its compatibility, it will default to normal but much slower charge parameters within the USB standard.
