= School-based assessment =

The Hong Kong Examinations and Assessment Authority (HKEAA) has moved from norm-referenced to standards-referenced assessment, including the incorporation of a substantial school-based summative oral assessment component(SBA) into the compulsory English language subject in the Hong Kong Certificate of Education Examination (HKCEE), a high-stakes examination for all Form 4–5 students (Davison, 2007).

== Background ==
School-based Assessment (SBA) was first proposed in the Reform Proposals for the Education System in Hong Kong, published in September 2000. According to the proposal, the modes, content and the assessment methods of public examinations should be reviewed (p. 44). A "core-competence" approach, similar to criterion-referencing, will be adopted. In this approach, basic skills and knowledge required by a Form 5 graduate will be indicated and students do not have to compare with the others. Under the education reforms in which a new culture of learning and teaching is to be cultivated, schools can use different modes of broad-based assessments, including observation of students' performance in classroom and participation in project work to promote learning in a more flexible manner. Another benefit is advocating students' all-round development which gives a more comprehensive picture of individual students' learning needs, as well as fosters the positive washback effects of public examinations. It also helps to address the limitations of judging students on their performance in one single examination.

== Rationales ==
The rationales laid down by the SBA Consultancy Team (2005) for implementing SBA are as follows:

- to continuously assess students in a pressure-free environment;
- to reduce reliance on ‘one-off’ public oral examination;
- to improve the reliability of oral English assessment;
- to reflect the standard and ability of students;
- to foster teaching and learning;
- to promote students’ leisure reading and listening;
- to reinforce learners’ autonomy and independent learning;
- to facilitate "learning how to learn" by carrying out peer reviews and writing after a model in the assessment tasks and trainings;
- to inform prospective employers and universities the level performance of students; and
- to make Hong Kong's examination system in line with the international model so that 'assessment for learning' is achieved; and
- to empower teachers to make part of the assessment mechanism (p. 50) (LPATE, 2005).

== Content ==
The SBA component, worth 15% of the total HKCEE English mark, involves four assessments of English oral language skills based on texts—one from each category: print fiction, print non-fiction, non-print fiction, non-print non-fiction—drawn from a programme of independent extensive reading and viewing (SBA Consultancy Team, 2005). At the time the SBA was introduced, students were required to choose at least four texts to read or view over the course of 2 years; keep brief notes in a logbook; and undertake a number of activities in and out of class to develop their independent reading, speaking, and generic skills. Due to teachers' concerns over excessive workload, the requirements have been modified to "at least three texts over the course of 2 years" (Davison, 2007).

The assessment format and requirements as originally specified in the introduction to the SBA in September 2005 are summarised in Table 1.

Requirements	Form 4	Form 5	Total
No. and type of texts to be read	Minimum of two texts, from two categories	Remaining two texts, remaining categories	Four texts, one from each category (print fiction, print nonfiction, non-print fiction, non-print non-fiction)
No. and timing of assessment, tasks to be undertaken	Minimum of two interactive tasks to be undertaken anytime during Form 4, must be on different texts	Minimum of one interactive task, one individual presentation to be undertaken anytime during F5, must be on different texts	Four tasks on four texts, one from each category
No., %, and timing of marks to be reported	One mark, best mark out of the two tasks, 5% of total English mark, reported at end of Form 4	Best mark for the interaction and best mark for the presentation, 10% of total English mark, reported at end of Form 5	15% of total English mark

Source: (SBA Consultancy Team, 2005, p. 5).

== Assessment criteria ==
For assessment students are required to partake in interactions with classmates on a particular aspect of the text they have read or viewed, leading up to making a more formal group interaction or an individual presentation on a specific text and responding to questions from their audience (HKEAA, 2008). Students are assessed according to a set of assessment criteria, consisting of a set of descriptors at each of six levels across four domains (HKEAA, 2007). The domains are briefly described as follows:

- Domain 1: Pronunciation and Delivery: Pronunciation comprises phonology and intonation.
- Domain 2: Communication Strategies: Communicative strategies involve body language, timing, and asking and answering appropriate kinds of questions.
- Domain 3: Vocabulary and Language Patterns: The vocabulary and language patterns domain consists of three important areas: vocabulary and language patterns (including the quantity, range, accuracy, and appropriacy), and self-correction/reformulation.
- Domain 4: Ideas and Organisation: The ideas and organisation domain consists of the expression of information and ideas, the elaboration of appropriate aspects of the topic, organisation, and questioning and responding to questions.

== Future development ==
The current SBA for HKCEE English Language will be extended to the Hong Kong Diploma of Secondary Education (HKDSE) English Language Examination from 2012 onwards(HKEAA, 2007). The SBA component will also be extended to other humanities and science subjects in HKDSE (HKEAA, 2009).

== Controversies ==
Using Brindley’s (1998) framework, the SBA component is controversial in terms of political issues, to do with the purposes and intended use of the assessment; technical issues, primarily to do with validity and reliability; and practical issues, to do with the means by which the assessment was put into practice. These issues were gathered from key stakeholder groups, including teachers, students and education bureau officials.

Politically, in Davison’s (2007) words, “In fact, the SBA guidelines asked teachers to set their own time limits according to the needs of the students, but this was interpreted through the prism of teachers’ existing experience—many schools used buzzers and stopwatches to allocate an identical period of time to each students, with the result that in some schools students’ stress levels were high and their “performance” very contrived and/or rushed. As an outcome-oriented standards-referenced system, SBA is a significant cultural and attitudinal change, not only for teachers but for the whole school community, including students and parents. Hence, it is not surprising that fairness was a deep-seated sociocultural, not just political concern."

Technically, many teachers and students are concerned over validity, reliability and fairness of the SBA component. While teacher-educators and researchers view that SBA will enhance the validity and reliability of the HKCEE theoretically, some frontline teachers and students are sceptical on this.

As for practical issues, teachers raised such concerns as:

- The need for access to appropriate assessment (and extensive reading) resources;
- The need for activities and techniques as models/resources;
- Concerns about the type of recordings of oral performance that they were expected to collect;
- Lack of practical support for teachers at the school level;
- Concerns about the adequacy of professional development in SBA;
- Lack of time to implement and discuss assessments; and
- Competing demands and priorities in relation to time allocation (Davison, 2007).

== See also ==
- HKCEE
- HKALE
- HKDSE
- 334 Scheme
