= Digital active signal collector =

Antenna for digital signal reception

Digital active signal collector (DASC) antenna is an active antenna for digital signal reception.

DASC antennas are often used in DVB-T receivers. With a DASC antenna it is possible to receive DVB-T signals with a small in-house antenna or a relative small outside antenna. The amplifier, built into the antenna, receives it power supply via the coax cable between the DVB-T box and the antenna.

The advantages of an active antenna compared to a passive antenna and a separate amplifier is that the (low) signal can be amplified before it is subject to loss and/or interference in the cables and connectors between antenna and amplifier.

An active antenna is an antenna with an integrated signal amplifier.
