= Accellera =

Standards association in electronic design

- Formation: 2000
- Purpose: Standards
- Official language: English
- Website: accellera.org

Accellera Systems Initiative (Accellera) is a standards organization that supports a mix of user and vendor standards and open interfaces development in the area of electronic design automation (EDA) and integrated circuit (IC) design and manufacturing. It is less constrained than the Institute of Electrical and Electronics Engineers (IEEE) and is therefore the starting place for many standards. Once mature and adopted by the broader community, the standards are usually transferred to the IEEE.

== History ==
In 2000, Accellera was founded from the merger of Open Verilog International (OVI) and VHDL International, the developers of Verilog and VHDL respectively. Both were originally formed nine years earlier in 1991.

In June 2009, a merger was announced between Accellera and The SPIRIT Consortium, another major EDA standards organization focused on IP deployment and reuse. The SPIRIT Consortium obtained SystemRDL from the SystemRDL Alliance and then developed IP-XACT. The merger was completed in April 2010. SPIRIT stood for "Structure for Packaging, Integrating and Re-using IP within Tool-flows".

In December 2011, Accellera and the Open SystemC Initiative (OSCI) approved their merger, adopting the name Accellera Systems Initiative (Accellera) while continuing to develop SystemC.

In October 2013, Accellera acquired the Open Core Protocol (OCP) standard, the intellectual property of the OCP International Partnership (OCP-IP).

=== The SPIRIT Consortium ===
The SPIRIT Consortium was a group of vendors and users of electronic design automation (EDA) tools, defining standards for the exchange of system-on-a-chip (SoC) design information. The standards defined included IP-XACT, an XML schema for vendor-neutral descriptions of design components, and SystemRDL, a language for describing registers in components. SPIRIT stood for "Structure for Packaging, Integrating and Re-using IP within Tool-flows".

In June 2009 it was announced that SPIRIT would merge with Accellera.

==== SPIRIT membership ====
There were four levels of membership in the SPIRIT consortium. The Board of Directors (BoD) was the ruling body. Members around the time of the merge were:

- ARM Holdings
- Cadence Design Systems
- Freescale Semiconductor
- LSI Corporation
- Mentor Graphics
- NXP Semiconductors
- STMicroelectronics
- Synopsys
- Texas Instruments

Contributing members performed the standardization work and donate time and effort to the production of new specifications.

Reviewing member status was a free membership for companies. These get early access to specifications to facilitate a deep review round of each proposal before it goes public.

Associate member status was similar to a reviewing membership but for academics and other not-for-profit organizations.

=== Open Core Protocol International Partnership Association ===
The Open Core Protocol International Partnership Association, Inc. (OCP-IP) was an independent, non-profit semiconductor industry consortium formed to administer the support, promotion and enhancement of the Open Core Protocol (OCP). OCP was the first fully supported, openly licensed, comprehensive, interface socket for semiconductor intellectual property (IP) cores. The mission of OCP-IP was to address problems relating to design, verification, and testing which are common to IP core reuse in "plug and play" system on a chip (SoC) products. This initiative comprehensively fulfills system-level integration requirements by promoting IP core reusability and reducing design time, risk and manufacturing costs for SoC designs. Design teams developing consumer, data processing, telecom (wireless or wired), datacom and mass storage applications can gain significant benefits from the OCP-IP solution.

== Accellera membership ==
Corporate members have a right to be eligible for election to the Board of Directors. Associate member companies have voting rights in all of Accellera's Technical Working Groups.

== Standards ==
The following EDA standards developed by Accellera were ratified by IEEE by 2019:

- Verilog or IEEE 1364 or IEC 61691-4
- VHDL or IEEE 1076 or IEC 61691-1-1
- Property Specification Language (PSL) or IEEE 1850 or IEC 62531
- SystemC or IEEE 1666
- SystemC Analog/Mixed-Signal extensions or IEEE 1666.1
- SystemVerilog or IEEE 1800
- Standard Delay Format (SDF) or IEEE 1497 or IEC 61523-3
- Delay and Power Calculation System (DPCS/OLA; see Standard Parasitic Exchange Format) or IEEE 1481
- Advanced Library Format (ALF) or IEEE 1603 or IEC 62265
- Open Compression Interface (OCI) or IEEE 1450.6.1
- Unified Power Format (UPF) or IEEE 1801
- Open Model Interface (OMI) or IEEE 1499
- IP-XACT or IEEE 1685
- Universal Verification Methodology (UVM) or IEEE 1800.2

The following EDA initiatives were developed by Accellera:

- Open Core Protocol (OCP)
- Open Verification Language (OVL)
- Open Verification Library (OVL)
- Portable Test & Stimulus Standard (PSS)
- Standard Co-Emulation-Modeling Interface (SCE-MI)
- Soft IP Tagging
- SystemRDL (System Register Description Language)
- Unified Coverage Interoperability Standard (UCIS)
- Universal Verification Methodology (UVM)
- Verilog-AMS (Analog Mixed-Signal)

== See also ==
- Design Automation Standards Committee (DASC)
