= Silicon Integration Initiative =

Silicon Integration Initiative (Si2) is a non-profit consortium of semiconductor, systems, EDA, and manufacturing companies, focused on improving the way integrated circuits are designed and manufactured. Si2 was founded in 1988 as CAD Framework Initiative, Inc., abbreviated as CFI. On the 34th Design Automation Conference (DAC) in 1997 the name changed to Si2.
