= TDMI =

TDMI may refer to: TD Management, Inc.

ARM7TDMI (16 bit Thumb + JTAG Debug + fast Multiplier + enhanced ICE)

- ARM9TDMI
