= BeRTOS =

Real-time operating system

- Developer: Develer s.r.l. and BeRTOS community
- Written in: ANSI C
- OS family: Real-time operating system
- Working state: Discontinued
- Source model: Open source
- Initial release: June 3, 2004; 22 years ago
- Final release: 2.7.99 / August 2011; 15 years ago
- Marketing target: Embedded systems
- Available in: English
- Update method: Compile from source code
- Supported platforms: ARM Cortex-M3, ARM ARM7TDMI, Atmel AVR, x86, x86-64
- Kernel type: Microkernel
- License: GPLv2 or later, with exception
- Official website: github.com/develersrl/bertos

BeRTOS was a real-time operating system designed for embedded systems.

It is free and open-source software released under the GNU General Public License, version 2 (GPLv2) or later, with a special exception granting proprietary applications the right to keep their source code closed while keeping the base BeRTOS code open.

It has a very modular design, that allows running it on different architectures, ranging from tiny 8-bit microcontrollers such as Atmel AVR microcontrollers up to the 32-bit ARM architecture, and on hosted environments such as Linux and Microsoft Windows. BeRTOS is written in ANSI C, and supported by popular embedded Secure Sockets Layer (SSL) and successor Transport Layer Security (TLS) libraries such as wolfSSL.

BeRTOS preemptive multitasking kernel implements many inter-process communication (IPC) primitives, including: signals, semaphores, and messages.

In addition to the kernel, BeRTOS provides a hardware abstraction layer (HAL) that includes many peripheral device drivers (timer, serial, analog-to-digital converter (ADC), motors, liquid-crystal display (LCD), NTC sensors, keyboard, buzzer, memories), algorithms (hash table, cyclic redundancy check (CRC), MD2, entropy pool, run-length encoding (RLE)), communication protocols, and a graphic windowing subsystem for small display devices.

It was archived in November 2018.

== See also ==
- Comparison of real-time operating systems
