= XMK =

XMK may refer to:

- The ISO-639-3.5 code for the Ancient Macedonian language
- The eXtreme Minimal Kernel, a real-time operating system
