= OS2000 =

Real-time operating system

Baget 2.0 RTOS (ОСРВ Багет 2.0)
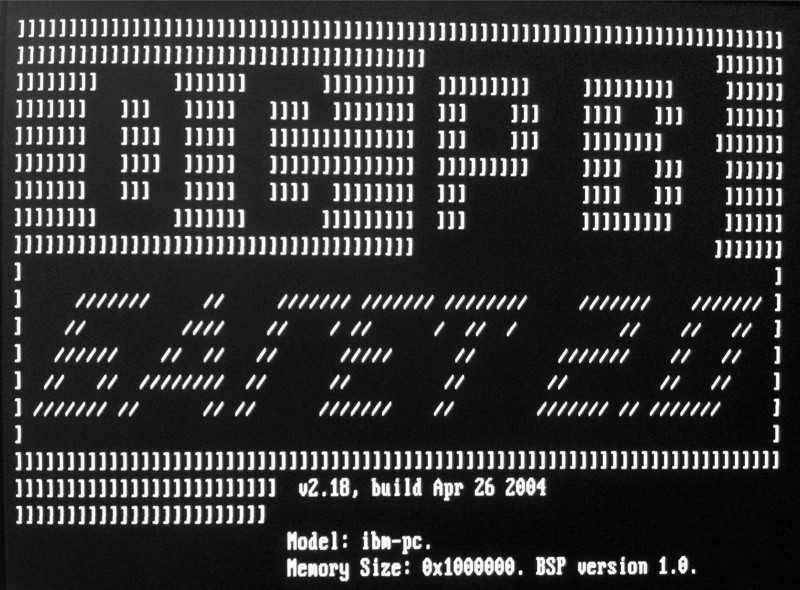
- Baget startup screen in ASCII art
- Developer: Scientific Research Institute of System Development of the Russian Academy of Sciences
- Written in: C
- OS family: Unix-like
- Working state: Current; passed state tests for military uses, state standard for a RTOS
- Source model: Source-available
- Initial release: September 19, 2002; 22 years ago (version 2.06)
- Latest release: 2.71.32 / November 16, 2011; 13 years ago
- Marketing target: Embedded systems
- Available in: Russian
- Update method: Compile from source code
- Platforms: MIPS (Baget-MIPS variant), KOMDIV-32, KOMDIV-64, Intel BSPs (x86)
- Kernel type: Microkernel real-time
- License: Proprietary
- Official website: www.niisi.ru/intro1.htm

Baget RTOS (Russian: ОСРВ Багет) is a real-time operating system developed by the Scientific Research Institute of System Development of the Russian Academy of Sciences for a MIPS architecture (Baget-MIPS variant) and Intel board support packages (BSPs) (x86 architecture). Baget is intended for software execution in a hard real-time embedded systems (firmware).

X Window System (client and server) was ported to Baget. It also has Ethernet support (Network File System (NFS), File Transfer Protocol (FTP), Telnet protocols), long filename File Allocation Table (VFAT) and a tar file systems, floppy disk drive (FDD) and hard disk drive (HDD) driver support. Several supported network cards are limited by some Realtek Industry Standard Architecture (ISA) and Peripheral Component Interconnect (PCI) cards.

The development process is based on the following principles:

- international standards compliance
- portability
- Scalability
- Microkernel
- Object-oriented programming
- Cross-platform development

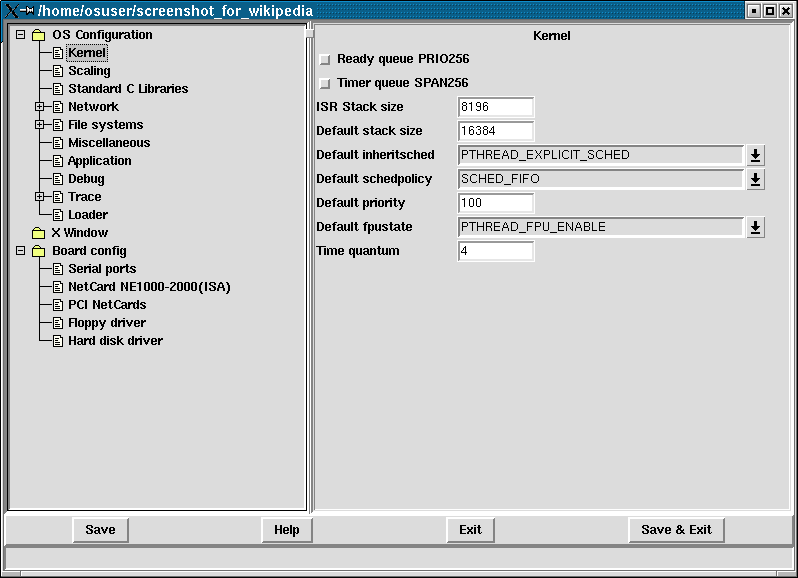
OS RV configuration window

== Standards compliance ==
- Portable Operating System Interface (POSIX) 1003.1, standard (application programming interface (API)),
- C standard programming language and libraries.

== See also ==
- Comparison of real-time operating systems
