= FreeRTOS =

Real-time operating system

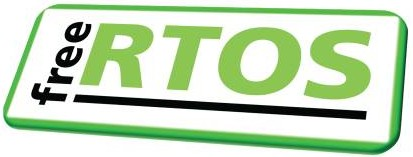
- Developer: Amazon Web Services
- Written in: C
- OS family: Real-time operating systems
- Working state: Current
- Source model: Open source
- Initial release: 2003; 23 years ago
- Latest release: v202411.00 / March 4, 2025; 19 months ago
- Repository: github.com/FreeRTOS
- Marketing target: Embedded systems
- Available in: English
- Supported platforms: ARM (ARM7, ARM9, Cortex-M3, -M4, -M7, -A, -R4), Atmel AVR, AVR32, HCS12, MicroBlaze, Cortus (APS1, APS3, APS3R, APS5, FPF3, FPS6, FPS8), MSP430, PIC, Renesas H8/S, SuperH, RX, x86, 8052, Coldfire, V850, 78K0R, Fujitsu series MB91460, MB96340, Nios II, TMS570, RM4x, Espressif ESP32, RISC-V (e.g. SHAKTI)
- Kernel type: Real-Time Microkernel
- License: MIT
- Official website: www.freertos.org

FreeRTOS is a real-time operating system kernel for embedded devices that has been ported to 40 microcontroller platforms. It is distributed under the MIT License.

== History ==
The FreeRTOS kernel was originally developed by Richard Barry around 2003, and was later developed and maintained by Barry's company, Real Time Engineers Ltd. In 2017, the firm passed stewardship of the FreeRTOS project to Amazon Web Services (AWS). Barry continues to work on FreeRTOS as part of an AWS team. With the transition to Amazon control, subsequent releases of the project also switched licensing from GPL version 2 (with special exceptions for static linking to proprietary code outside the FreeRTOS kernel itself) to MIT.

== Implementation ==
FreeRTOS is designed to be small and simple. It is mostly written in the C programming language to make it easy to port and maintain. It also comprises a few assembly language functions where needed, mostly in architecture-specific context-switching routines used by the scheduler.

=== Process management ===
FreeRTOS provides methods for multiple threads or tasks, mutexes, semaphores and software timers. A tickless mode is provided for low power applications. Thread priorities are supported. FreeRTOS applications can be statically allocated, but objects can also be dynamically allocated with five schemes of memory management (allocation):

- allocate only;
- allocate and free with a very simple and fast algorithm;
- a more complex but fast allocate and free algorithm with memory coalescence;
- an alternative to the more complex scheme that includes memory coalescence that allows a heap to be broken across multiple memory areas.
- and C library allocate and free with some mutual exclusion protection.

RTOSes typically do not have the more advanced features that are found in operating systems like Linux and Microsoft Windows, such as device drivers, advanced memory management, and user accounts. The emphasis is on compactness and speed of execution. FreeRTOS can be thought of as a thread library rather than an operating system, although command line interface and POSIX-like input/output (I/O) abstraction are available.

FreeRTOS implements multiple threads by having the host program call a thread tick method at regular short intervals. The thread tick method switches tasks depending on priority and a round-robin scheduling scheme. The usual interval is 1 to 10 milliseconds (1/1000 to 1/100 of a second) via an interrupt from a hardware timer, but this interval is often changed to suit a given application.

The software distribution contains prepared configurations and demonstrations for every port and compiler, allowing rapid application design. The project website provides documentation and RTOS tutorials, and details of the RTOS design.

== Key features ==
- Book and reference manuals.
- Small memory size, low overhead, and fast execution.
- Tick-less option for low power applications.
- Intended for both hobbyists and professional developers working on commercial products.
- Scheduler can be configured for both preemptive or cooperative multitasking.
- Coroutine support (coroutines in FreeRTOS are simple and lightweight tasks with limited use of the call stack)
- Trace support through generic trace macros. Tools such as Tracealyzer, a commercial tool by FreeRTOS partner Percepio, can thereby record and visualize the runtime behavior of FreeRTOS-based systems for debugging and verification. This includes task scheduling and kernel calls for semaphore and queue operations.

== Supported architectures ==
- Altera Nios II
- ARM architecture
  - ARM7
  - ARM9
  - ARM Cortex-M
  - ARM Cortex-A
- Atmel
  - Atmel AVR
  - AVR32
  - SAM3, SAM4
  - SAM7, SAM9
  - SAMD20, SAML21
- Ceva
  - Ceva-BXx
  - SensPro
  - Ceva-XC16
  - Ceva-XM6
  - Ceva-Xx
  - Ceva-XM4
- Cortus
  - APS1
  - APS3
  - APS3R
  - APS5
  - FPS6
  - FPS8
- Cypress
  - PSoC
- eSi-RISC
  - eSi-16x0
  - eSi-32x0
- DSP Group
  - DBMD7
- Espressif
  - ESP8266
  - ESP32
- Fujitsu
  - FM3
  - MB91460
  - MB96340
- Freescale
  - Coldfire V1, V2
  - HCS12
  - Kinetis
- IBM
  - PPC404, PPC405
- Infineon
  - TriCore
  - Infineon XMC4000
- Intel
  - x86
  - 8052
- Microchip Technology
  - PIC18, PIC24, dsPIC
  - PIC32
- Microsemi
  - SmartFusion
- Multiclet
  - P1
- NXP
  - LPC1000
  - LPC2000
  - LPC4300
- Renesas
  - 78K0R
  - RL78
  - H8/S
  - RX600
  - RX200
  - SuperH
  - V850
- RISC-V
  - RV32I
  - RV64I
  - PULP RI5CY
- Silicon Labs
  - EFM32 Gecko (ARM Cortex)
- STMicroelectronics
  - STM32
  - STR7
- Texas Instruments
  - C2000 series (TMS320F28x)
  - MSP430
  - Stellaris
  - Hercules (TMS570LS04 & RM42)
- Xilinx
  - MicroBlaze
  - Zynq-7000

== Derivations ==
=== Amazon FreeRTOS ===
Amazon provides a now deprecated extension of FreeRTOS, this is FreeRTOS with libraries for Internet of things (IoT) support, specifically for Amazon Web Services. Since version 10.0.0 in 2017, Amazon has taken stewardship of the FreeRTOS code, including any updates to the original kernel.

=== SAFERTOS ===
SAFERTOS was developed as a complementary version of FreeRTOS, with common functions, but designed for safety-critical implementation. FreeRTOS was subject to hazard and operability study (HAZOP), and weaknesses were identified and resolved. The result was put through a full IEC 61508 SIL 3 development lifecycle, the highest level for a software-only component.

SAFERTOS was developed by Wittenstein High Integrity Systems, in partnership with Real Time Engineers Ltd, primary developer of the FreeRTOS project. Both SAFERTOS and FreeRTOS share the same scheduling algorithm, have similar application programming interfaces (APIs), and are otherwise very similar, but they were developed with differing objectives. SAFERTOS was developed solely in the C language to meet requirements for certification to IEC61508.

SAFERTOS can reside solely in the on-chip read-only memory (ROM) of a microcontroller for standards compliance. When implemented in hardware memory, SAFERTOS code can only be used in its original, certified configuration. This means certifying a system needs no retesting of the kernel portion of a design. SAFERTOS is included in the ROM of some Stellaris Microcontrollers from Texas Instruments. SAFERTOS source code does not need to be separately purchased. In this usage scenario, a C header file is used to map SAFERTOS API functions to their location in read-only memory.

=== OPENRTOS ===
OPENRTOS is a commercially licensed version of Amazon FreeRTOS, sold by Wittenstein High Integrity Systems. This product provides support and allows companies to use the Amazon FreeRTOS kernel and libraries under the terms of a commercial license instead of the MIT open source license.

== See also ==
- Embedded operating system
- Comparison of real-time operating systems
