= AT91CAP =

AT91CAP (AT91CAP Customizable Atmel Microcontrollers) is a family of Atmel microcontrollers based on the 32-bit RISC microprocessors from ARM (Atmel was bought by Microchip Technology in 2016). They include a block of metal-programmable logic gates (MP Block) that can be personalized by the application developer. The MP Block can contain one or more additional processor cores, additional peripherals or interfaces, or application-specific logic such as a GPS correlator.

CAP products feature embedded SRAM and ROM memories and an external bus for additional memories including flash memory, together with a number of peripherals and standard communications and networking interfaces. This qualifies them as system-on-a-chip devices.

External interfaces include USB, CAN, Ethernet, SPI, USART and ADC. A DMA controller provides direct communication channels between external interfaces and memories, increasing data throughput with minimal processor intervention.

Peripherals include counter/timers, power-on reset generators, voltage regulators and advanced interrupt controller. This enhances the real time performance of the processor. A power management controller keeps power consumption to a minimum by powering down unused peripherals and interfaces, and enabling the processor to be put in standby mode.

The AT91CAP comes in both ARM7 and ARM9 versions.

The CAP design flow emphasizes parallel hardware/software development. An FPGA-based emulation board enables the hardware and software of the application under development to be thoroughly tested at close to full operational speed in order to validate the functionality of the device.
