= Soft Hard Real-Time Kernel =

S.Ha.R.K.
- Developer: Sant'Anna School of Advanced Studies
- OS family: Unix-like real-time operating systems
- Working state: Current
- Source model: Open source
- Latest release: 1.5.3 / January 17, 2007
- Kernel type: Microkernel
- License: GNU General Public License
- Official website: shark.sssup.it

S.Ha.R.K. (the acronym stands for Soft Hard Real-time Kernel) is a completely configurable kernel architecture designed for supporting hard, soft, and non real-time applications with interchangeable scheduling algorithms.

== Main features ==
The kernel architecture's main benefit is that an application can be developed independently from a particular system configuration. This allows new modules to be added or replaced in the same application, so that specific scheduling policies can be evaluated for predictability, overhead and performance.

== Applications ==
S.Ha.R.K. was developed at RETIS Lab, a research facility of the Sant'Anna School of Advanced Studies, and at the University of Pavia, as a tool for teaching, testing and developing real-time software systems. It is used for teaching at many universities, including the Sant'Anna School of Advanced Studies and Malardalens University in Sweden.

== Modularity ==
Unlike the kernels in traditional operating systems, S.Ha.R.K. is fully modular in terms of scheduling policies, aperiodic servers, and concurrency control protocols. Modularity is achieved by partitioning system activities between a generic kernel and a set of modules, which can be registered at initialization to configure the kernel according to specific application requirements.

== History ==
S.Ha.R.K. is the evolution of the Hartik Kernel and it is based on the OSLib Project.

== See also ==
- Real-time operating system
