= Apache Mynewt =

Real-time operating system

Mynewt
- Developer: Apache Software Foundation, community
- Written in: C (Mynewt OS); Go (Newt Tool)
- Working state: Stable
- Source model: Open-source
- Latest release: 1.11.0 / September 7, 2023; 2 years ago
- Repository: github.com/apache/mynewt-core
- Supported platforms: Cortex-M0, Cortex-M3, Cortex-M4, Cortex-M7, MIPS32, Microchip PIC32, RISC-V
- License: Apache License 2.0
- Official website: mynewt.apache.org

Apache Mynewt is a modular real-time operating system for connected Internet of things (IoT) devices that must operate for long times under power, memory, and storage constraints. It is free and open-source software incubating under the Apache Software Foundation, with source code distributed under the Apache License 2.0, a permissive license that is conducive to commercial adoption of open-source software.

== Overview ==
Apache Mynewt is a real-time operating system with a rich set of libraries intended to make prototyping, deploying, and managing 32-bit microcontroller based IoT devices easy. It is highly composable, to allow building embedded system applications (e.g., locks, medical devices, industrial IoT) across different types of microcontrollers. The name Mynewt is wordplay on the English word minute, meaning very small: the kernel is only 6 KB in size.

The OS is designed for connectivity, and comes with a full implementation of the Bluetooth low energy 4.2 stack. With the addition of BLE (supporting all Bluetooth 4.2 compliant security features except privacy) and various utilities such as the default file system, console, shell, logs, stats, etc., the image size is approximately 96 KB for the Nordic nRF51822 Bluetooth SoC. This size metric excludes the boot loader image.

== Core features ==
The core operating system supports:^{[3]}

- Preemptive multithreading
- Tickless priority based scheduling
- Programmable timers
- System time
- Semaphores
- Mutexes
- Event queues
- Memory management (allocation): dynamic (heap) and pool
- Multi-stage software watchdog timer
- Memory or data buffers, to hold packet data as it moves up and down the networking protocol stack

Other features and utilities include:

- Hardware abstraction layer with support for CPU time, analog-to-digital converter (ADC), digital-to-analog converter (DAC), general-purpose input/output (GPIO), Inter-Integrated Circuit (I^{2}C), pulse-width modulation (PWM), serial port, Serial Peripheral Interface Bus (SPI), universal asynchronous receiver/transmitter (UART).
- Newtron flash file system (nffs) with minimal RAM usage and reliability features
- File system abstraction to allow client code to choose alternate file systems
- Console access and shell package
- Secure boot loader and image organizer (manager) that includes image integrity verification using SHA-256 and optional digital signature verification of images before running them
- Test utilities to build regression testing
- Statistics and logs for all major packages
- JavaScript Object Notation (JSON) encoder and decoder libraries
- Lua interpreter

== Bluetooth low energy ==
The first network stack available in Mynewt is Bluetooth low energy and is called NimBLE. It complies with Bluetooth Core Specification 5.0.

NimBLE includes both the host and controller components. Access to the controller source code makes the BLE performance highly configurable. For example, the BLE throughput can be adjusted by changing the connection intervals, data packet size, packet queue size etc. A use case requiring a large number of concurrent connections can similarly be configured, provided there is adequate RAM allocated. Example applications that demonstrate how to use available services are included in the package.

== Supported boards ==
The operating system is designed for cross-platform use in embedded systems (devices) and microcontrollers. It includes board support packages for the following, as of July 2023:

- nRF52 DK from Nordic Semiconductor (Cortex-M4)
- RuuviTag Sensor beacon platform (Nordic nRF52832 based)
- nRF51 DK from Nordic Semiconductor (Cortex-M0)
- VBLUno51 from VNG IoT Lab (Nordic nRF51822 SoC based)
- VBLUno52 from VNG IoT Lab (Nordic nRF52832 SoC based, Cortex-M4)
- BLE Nano from RedBear (Nordic nRF51822 SoC based)
- BLE Nano2 and Blend2 from RedBear (Nordic nRF52832 SoC based)
- BMD-300-EVAL-ES from Rigado (Cortex-M4)
- BMD-200 from Rigado (Cortex-M0)
- Adafruit Feather nRF52 Pro
- STM32F4DISCOVERY from ST Micro (Cortex-M4)
- STM32-E407 from Olimex (Cortex-M4)
- Arduino Zero (Cortex-M0)
- Arduino Zero Pro (Cortex-M0)
- Arduino M0 Pro (Cortex-M0)
- Arduino MKR1000 (Cortex-M0)
- Arduino Primo NRF52 (Cortex-M4)
- NUCLEO-F401RE (Cortex-M4)
- NUCLEO-F767ZI (Cortex-M7)
- Discovery kit for STM32F7 Series (Cortex-M7)
- FRDM-K64F from NXP (Cortex-M4)
- BBC micro:bit (Nordic nrf51822; Cortex-M0)
- SiFive HiFive1 (RISC-V Instruction Set Architecture)
- NINA-B1 BLE module from u-blox (Cortex-M4)
- 6LoWPAN clicker from MikroElectronika (PIC32MX470 microcontroller)
- chipKIT Wi-FIRE (PIC32MZ microcontroller)
- Creator Ci40 module (dual MIPS interAptiv CPU)
- EE-02 board with Semtech Sx1276 chip from Telenor (Cortex-M4)
- DA1469x Pro DK from Dialog Semiconductor (Cortex-M33)

== Package management ==
The project includes the Newt Tool which is a command-line interface (CLI) based smart source package manager system for embedded systems development. Also, it allows composing builds with specified packages and compiler options, generating images and their digital signatures, and finally downloading and debugging the firmware on different targets.

== See also ==
- Embedded operating system
- Comparison of real-time operating systems
