= WolfSSL =

Implementation of TLS protocols

wolfSSL
- Developer: Todd Ouska
- Release: February 19, 2006
- Stable release: 5.9.4 / 27 September 2026
- Written in: C
- Operating system: Multi-platform
- Type: Cryptography library
- License: GPL-3.0-or-later or proprietary
- Website: www.wolfssl.com
- Repository: github.com/wolfssl/wolfssl

wolfSSL is a small, portable, embedded SSL/TLS library targeted for use by embedded systems developers. It is an open source implementation of TLS (SSL 3.0, TLS 1.0, 1.1, 1.2, 1.3, and DTLS 1.0, 1.2, and 1.3) written in the C programming language. It includes SSL/TLS client libraries and an SSL/TLS server implementation as well as support for multiple APIs, including those defined by SSL and TLS. wolfSSL also includes an OpenSSL compatibility interface with the most commonly used OpenSSL functions.

== Platforms ==
wolfSSL is currently available for Microsoft Windows, Linux, macOS, Solaris, ESP32, ESP8266, ThreadX, VxWorks, FreeBSD, NetBSD, OpenBSD, embedded Linux, Yocto Project, OpenEmbedded, WinCE, Haiku, OpenWrt, iPhone, Android, Wii, and GameCube through DevKitPro support, QNX, MontaVista, Tron variants, NonStop OS, OpenCL, Micrium's MicroC/OS-II, FreeRTOS, SafeRTOS, Freescale MQX, Nucleus, TinyOS, TI-RTOS, HP-UX, uTasker, uT-kernel, embOS, INtime, mbed, RIOT, CMSIS-RTOS, FROSTED, Green Hills INTEGRITY, Keil RTX, TOPPERS, PetaLinux, Apache Mynewt, and PikeOS, Deos, Azure Sphere OS, Zephyr, AIX, and Cesium.

== History ==
The genesis of wolfSSL dates to 2004. OpenSSL was available at the time, and was dual licensed under the OpenSSL License and the SSLeay license. yaSSL, alternatively, was developed and dual-licensed under both a commercial license and the GPL. yaSSL offered a more modern API, commercial style developer support and was complete with an OpenSSL compatibility layer. The first major user of wolfSSL/CyaSSL/yaSSL was MySQL. Through bundling with MySQL, yaSSL has achieved extremely high distribution volumes in the millions.

In February 2019, Daniel Stenberg, the creator of cURL, was hired by the wolfSSL project to work on cURL.

== Protocols ==
The wolfSSL lightweight SSL library implements the following protocols:

- SSL 3.0, TLS 1.0, TLS 1.1, TLS 1.2, TLS 1.3
- DTLS 1.0, DTLS 1.2, DTLS 1.3
- Extensions: Server Name Indication (SNI), Maximum Fragment Length, Truncated HMAC, Application Layer Protocol Negotiation (ALPN), Extended Master Secret, Supported Elliptic Curves
- Ciphersuites: TLS Secure Remote Password, TLS Pre-Shared Key
- Post-quantum cryptography: ML-DSA added to sigAlgs, ML-KEM added to Supported Groups, QSH (deprecated and removed), Dual Algorithm Certificate, and TLS 1.3 Dual Algorithm Authentication Support
- Hybrid TLS Key Establishment Schemes:
  - ECDHE P-256 with Kyber Level 1
  - ECDHE P-384 with Kyber Level 3
  - ECDHE P-521 with Kyber Level 5
- Public Key Cryptography Standards:
  - PKCS #1 - RSA Cryptography
  - PKCS #3 - Diffie-Hellman Key Agreement
  - PKCS #5 - Password-Based Encryption
  - PKCS #7 - Cryptographic Message Syntax (CMS)
  - PKCS #8 - Private-Key Information Syntax
  - PKCS #9 - Selected Attribute Types
  - PKCS #10 - Certificate signing request (CSR)
  - PKCS #11 - Cryptographic Token Interface
  - PKCS #12 - Certificate/Personal Information Exchange Syntax Standard
- QUIC support
- OCSP, OCSP Stapling, CRL
- HPKE (Hybrid Public Key Encryption)
- ECH (Encryption Client Hello)
- x.509v3 Certificates
- Mutual authentication

Protocol Notes:

- SSL 2.0 – SSL 2.0 was deprecated (prohibited) in 2011 by RFC 6176. wolfSSL does not support it.
- SSL 3.0 – SSL 3.0 was deprecated (prohibited) in 2015 by RFC 7568. In response to the POODLE attack, SSL 3.0 has been disabled by default since wolfSSL 3.6.6, but can be enabled with a compile-time option.

== Algorithms ==
wolfSSL uses the following cryptography libraries:

=== wolfCrypt ===
By default, wolfSSL uses the cryptographic services provided by wolfCrypt. wolfCrypt Provides RSA, DSA, ECC, DSS, Diffie–Hellman, EDH, ECDH-ECDSA, ECDHE-ECDSA, ECDH-RSA, ECDHE-RSA, NTRU (deprecated and removed), DES, Triple DES, AES (CBC, CTR, CCM, GCM, OFB, XTS, GMAC, CMAC), Camellia, IDEA, ARC4, HC-128, ChaCha20, MD2, MD4, MD5, SHA-1, SHA-2, SHA-3, BLAKE2, RIPEMD-160, Poly1305, SM2, SM3, SM4 Random Number Generation, Large Integer support, base 16/64 encoding/decoding, HMAC, PBKDF2, and post-quantum cryptographic algorithms: ML-KEM (certified under FIPS 203) and ML-DSA (certified under FIPS 204).

- ECC curve types: SECP, SECPR2, SECPR3, BRAINPOOL, KOBLITZ
- ECC key lengths: 112, 128, 160, 192, 224, 239, 256, 320, 384, 512, 521

wolfCrypt also includes support for the X25519 and Ed25519 algorithms, as well as the X448 and Ed448 algorithms..

wolfCrypt acts as a back-end crypto implementation for several popular software packages and libraries, including MIT Kerberos (where it can be enabled using a build option).

wolfCrypt is FIPS validated and holds two FIPS 140-2 certificates (#2425 and #3389) and two FIPS 140-3 certificates (#4718 and #5041).

=== NTRU ===
CyaSSL+ includes NTRU public key encryption. The addition of NTRU in CyaSSL+ was a result of the partnership between yaSSL and Security Innovation. NTRU works well in mobile and embedded environments due to the reduced bit size needed to provide the same security as other public key systems. In addition, it's not known to be vulnerable to quantum attacks. Several cipher suites utilizing NTRU are available with CyaSSL+ including AES-256, RC4, and HC-128.

== Post-Quantum ==
wolfSSL provides support for a range of post-quantum cryptographic algorithms, including the Kyber Key Encapsulation Mechanism (KEM), hybridized with NIST-recommended ECC curves to maintain FIPS compliance. Supported ML-KEM levels include Level 1 (ML-KEM-512), Level 3 (ML-KEM-768), and Level 5 (ML-KEM-1024). For digital signatures, wolfSSL implements ML-DSA at Levels 2, 3, and 5; FALCON at Levels 1 and 5; and SLH-DSA, LMS/HSS, and XMSS/XMSS^MT. The library also supports hybrid TLS key exchange schemes, combining ECDHE with ML-KEM at corresponding security levels as well as dual-algorithm certificates and TLS 1.3 dual-algorithm authentication.

== Hardware Integration ==
=== Secure Element Support ===
wolfSSL supports the following Secure Elements:

- STMicroelectronics STSAFE
- Microchip CryptoAuthentication ATECC508A
- Microchip TA100
- NXP EdgeLock SE050 Secure Element

=== Technology Support ===
wolfSSL supports the following hardware technologies:

- Intel SGX (Software Guard Extensions) - Intel SGX allows a smaller attack surface and has been shown to provide a higher level of security for executing code without a significant impact on performance.
- NXP CAAM (Cryptographic Acceleration and Assurance Module) on i.MX6 (QNX), i.MX8 (QNX/Linux), RT1170 FreeRTOS
- ARM TrustZone CryptoCell 310
- MAXQ1065/1080 RNG
- MAX32665 and MAX32666 TPU (Trust Protection Unit)

== Licensing ==
wolfSSL is dual licensed: under both the GPL-3.0-or-later license and commercial licensing.

== See also ==
- Transport Layer Security
- Comparison of TLS implementations
- Comparison of cryptography libraries
- GnuTLS
- Network Security Services
- OpenSSL
