= XMK (operating system) =

- Developer: Shift-Right Technologies
- Written in: C
- OS family: Real-time operating systems
- Official website: www.integerfox.com/xmk/

The eXtreme Minimal Kernel (XMK) is a real-time operating system (RTOS) that is designed for minimal RAM/ROM use. It achieves this goal, though it is almost entirely written in the C programming language. As a consequence it can be easily ported to any 8-, 16-, or 32-bit microcontroller.

XMK comes as two independent packages: the XMK Scheduler that contains the core kernel, everything necessary to run a multithreaded embedded application, and the Application Programming Layer (APL) that provides higher level functions atop the XMK Scheduler API.

The XMK distribution contains no standard libraries such as libc that should be part of the development tools for target systems.
