= ARM7 =

32-bit ARM processor architecture

General information
- Designed by: ARM Holdings

Architecture and classification
- Instruction set: ARM (32-bit) (ARMv3)

ARM7T
Architecture and classification
- Instruction set: ARM (32-bit), Thumb (16-bit) (ARMv4T)

ARM7EJ-S
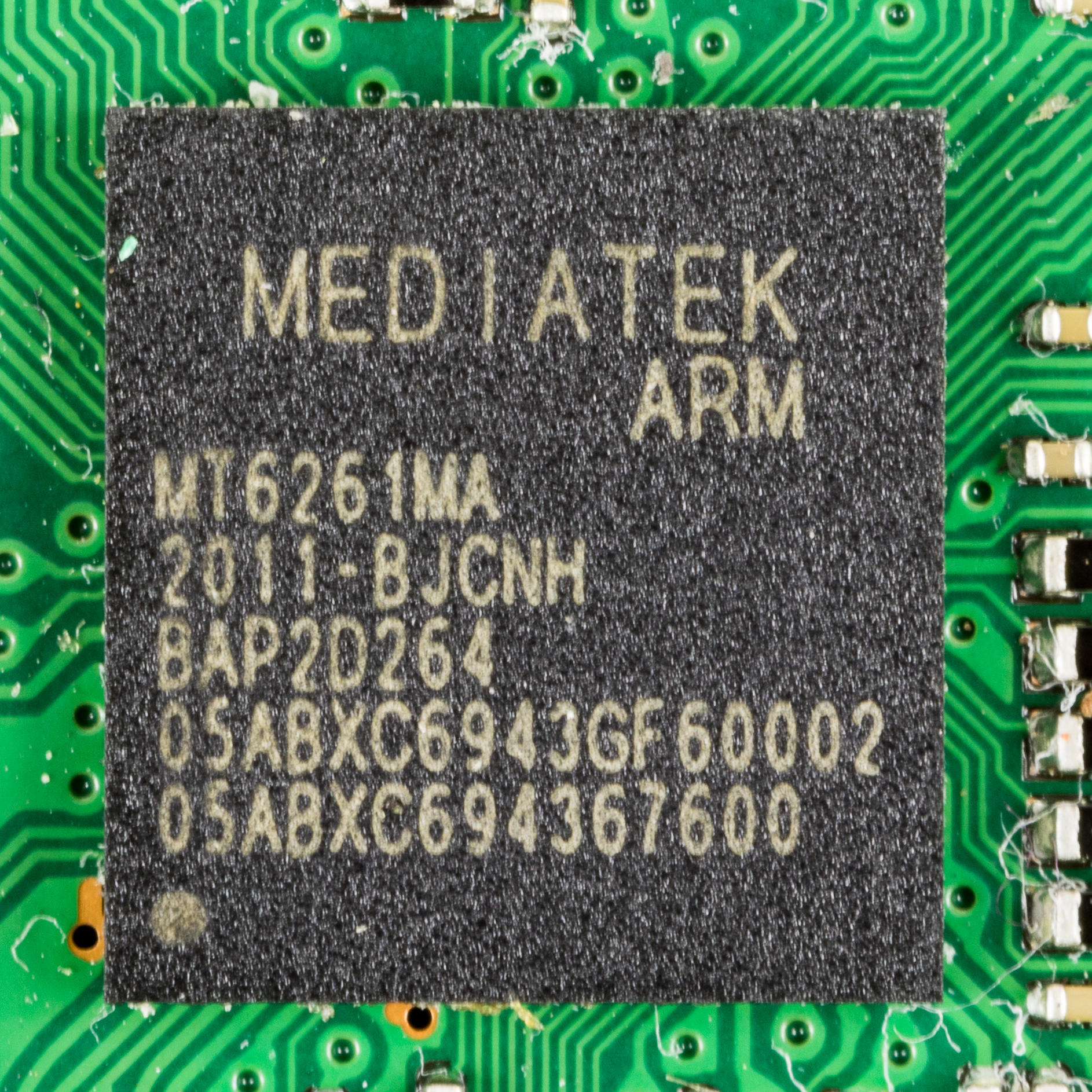

Architecture and classification
- Instruction set: ARM (32-bit), Thumb (16-bit), Jazelle (8-bit) (ARMv5TEJ)

ARM7 is a group of 32-bit RISC ARM processor cores licensed by ARM Holdings for microcontroller use. The ARM7 core family consists of ARM700, ARM710, ARM7DI, ARM710a, ARM720T, ARM740T, ARM710T, ARM7TDMI, ARM7TDMI-S, ARM7EJ-S. The ARM7TDMI and ARM7TDMI-S were the most popular cores of the family. ARM7 cores were released from 1993 to 2001 and no longer recommended for new IC designs; newer alternatives are ARM Cortex-M cores.

== Overview ==
This generation introduced the Thumb 16-bit instruction set providing improved code density compared to previous designs. The most widely used ARM7 designs implement the ARMv4T architecture, but some implement ARMv3 or ARMv5TEJ. ARM7TDMI has 37 registers (31 GPR and 6 SPR). All these designs use a Von Neumann architecture, thus the few versions containing a cache do not separate data and instruction caches.

Some ARM7 cores are obsolete. One historically significant model, the ARM7DI is notable for having introduced JTAG based on-chip debugging; the preceding ARM6 cores did not support it. The "D" represented a JTAG TAP for debugging; the "I" denoted an ICEBreaker debug module supporting hardware breakpoints and watchpoints, and letting the system be stalled for debugging. Subsequent cores included and enhanced this support.

It is a versatile processor designed for mobile devices and other low power electronics. This processor architecture is capable of up to 130 MIPS on a typical 0.13 μm process. The ARM7TDMI processor core implements ARM architecture v4T. The processor supports both 32-bit and 16-bit instructions via the ARM and Thumb instruction sets.

ARM licenses the processor to various semiconductor companies, which design full chips based on the ARM processor architecture.

=== ARM license ===
ARM Holdings neither manufactures nor sells CPU devices based on its own designs, but rather licenses the processor architecture to interested parties. ARM offers a variety of licensing terms, varying in cost and deliverables. To all licensees, ARM provides an integratable hardware description of the ARM core, as well as complete software development toolset and the right to sell manufactured silicon containing the ARM CPU.

=== Silicon customization ===
Integrated device manufacturers (IDM) receive the ARM Processor IP as synthesizable RTL (written in Verilog). In this form, they have the ability to perform architectural level optimizations and extensions. This allows the manufacturer to achieve custom design goals, such as higher clock speed, very low power consumption, instruction set extensions, optimizations for size, debug support, etc. To determine which components have been included in a particular ARM CPU chip, consult the manufacturer datasheet and related documentation.

== Cores ==
Year	ARM7 Cores
1993	ARM700
1994	ARM710
1994	ARM7DI
1994	ARM7TDMI
1995	ARM710a
1997	ARM710T
1997	ARM720T
1997	ARM740T
2001	ARM7TDMI-S
2001	ARM7EJ-S

The original ARM7 was based on the earlier ARM6 design and used the same ARMv3 instruction set. The ARM710 variant was used in a CPU module for the Acorn Risc PC, and the first ARM based System on a Chip designs ARM7100 and ARM7500 used this core.

=== ARM7TDMI ===
The ARM7TDMI (ARM7 + 16 bit Thumb + JTAG Debug + fast Multiplier + enhanced ICE) processor implements the ARMv4 instruction set. It was licensed for manufacture by an array of semiconductor companies. In 2009, it was one of the most widely used ARM cores, and is found in numerous deeply embedded system designs.

Texas Instruments licensed the ARM7TDMI, which was designed into the Nokia 6110, the first ARM-powered GSM phone. This led to the popular series of Nokia phones using the processor, including the 3210 and 3310. It is also used on the Game Boy Advance handheld (as well as the Nintendo DS), as well as being used as the core for the mechanics controller in the PlayStation 2 for the SCPH-5000x series onwards.

The ARM7TDMI-S variant is the synthesizable core.

=== ARM7EJ-S ===
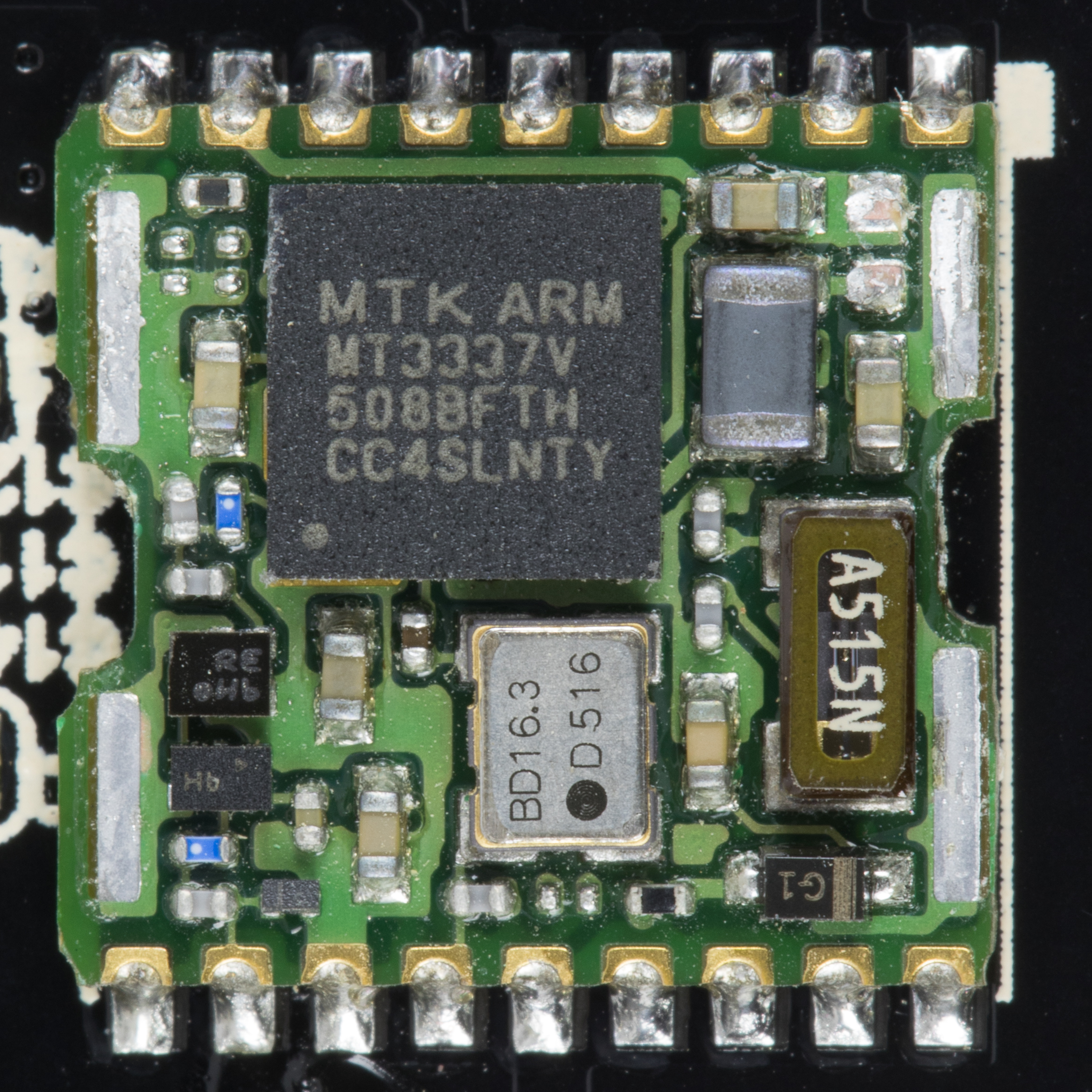
MediaTek MT3337V – ARM7EJ-S processor

The ARM7EJ-S (ARM7 + Enhanced + Jazelle - Synthesizable) is a version of ARM7 implementing the ARMv5TE instruction set originally introduced with the more powerful ARM9E core.

== Chips ==
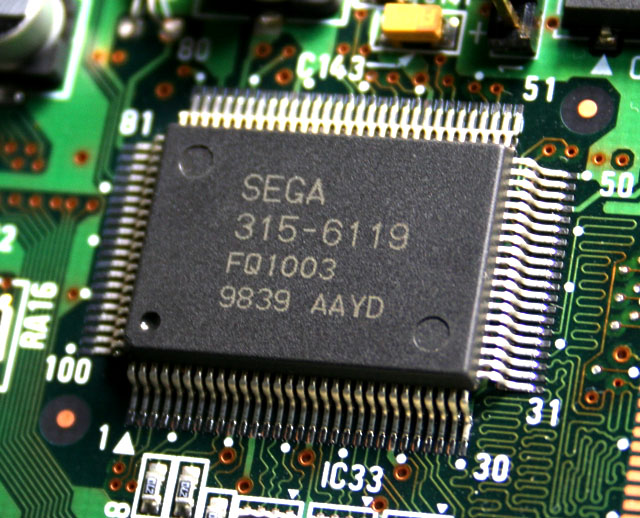
Yamaha AICA sound processor in Dreamcast game console

=== ARM7TDMI or ARM7TDMI-S core ===
- Analog Devices AD6720 (used in LG KG130/150), AD6724 (used in LG KP130/135), AD6726 (used in LG KP170/175)
- Atmel AT91M, AT91R, AT91SAM7L, AT91SAM7S/SE, AT91SAM7X/XC (see AT91SAM7)
- STMicroelectronics STR7
- Alcatel Microelectronics (STMicroelectronics) ALCATEL 2840 (MTC-20276 INTQ, MTC-20277 INTT); used in Alcatel One Touch 30x (BE4)
- PortalPlayer PP5002, PP5022 (used in iPods)
- NXP LPC2100, LPC2200, LPC2300, LPC2400

=== Unreferenced ARM7 core ===
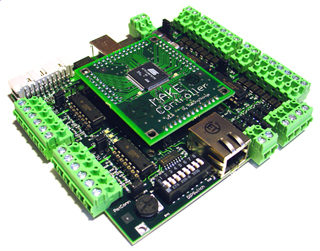
The Make Controller Kit with an Atmel AT91SAM7X256 (ARM) microcontroller

- ADMtek ADM8628
- Atmel AT91CAP7
- Cirrus Logic CL-PS7110
- Mediatek MT2502 (ARM7 EJ-STM)
- NetSilicon NS7520
- Nuvoton NUC500, NUC700
- LH7
- PortalPlayer 5002, 5003, 5020, 5021-TDF, 5022, 5024 SOCs (dual ARM7TDI cores)
- Samsung S3C46Q0X01-EE8X, S3C44B0X
- Yamaha AICA (ARM7DI) – sound processor with DSP

== Notable uses ==
- Apple eMate 300 – laptop running Newton OS
- Apple iPod – the first 5 generations of the iPod Classic as well as the Mini and first Nano used dual-core ARM7TDMI processors
- iRobot Roomba – robotic vacuum cleaner
- Lego Mindstorms NXT – 2nd generation robotics toy line from Lego
- Microsoft Zune HD – portable media player
- Nintendo Game Boy Advance – handheld video game console
- Nintendo DS – successor to the Game Boy Advance
- Nokia 6110 – first GSM phone to use an ARM processor
- Sega Dreamcast – home video game console (audio coprocessor)
- Sony PlayStation 2 – home video game console (security handler; later models only)

== See also ==
- ARM architecture
- List of ARM microarchitectures
- JTAG
- Real-time operating system, Comparison of real-time operating systems
