= Peripheral DMA controller =

A peripheral DMA controller (PDC) is an embedded direct memory access (DMA) controller found in many modern microcontrollers, which has direct access to memory and other embedded peripheral interfaces such as UARTs.

This takes a large burden from the operating system and reduces the number of interrupts required to service and control peripheral devices.

== See also ==
- Autonomous peripheral operation
