= Actel =

Defunct American technology company

Actel Corporation
- Type: Public
- Traded as: Nasdaq: ACTL
- Industry: Integrated Circuits
- Founded: 1985; 41 years ago
- Successor: Microsemi
- Headquarters: San Jose, California, United States
- Products: FPGAs, Embedded Processors
- Revenue: ▲US$191 Million (FY 2009)
- Operating income: ▼US$-21.3 Million (FY 2009)
- Net income: ▼US$-46.2 Million (FY 2009)
- Total assets: ▼US$307 Million (FY 2009)
- Total equity: ▼US$233 Million (FY 2009)
- Number of employees: 500+
- Website: www.actel.com www.microsemi.com

Actel Corporation was an American manufacturer of nonvolatile, low-power field-programmable gate arrays (FPGAs), mixed-signal FPGAs, and programmable logic solutions. It had its headquarters in Mountain View, California, with offices worldwide. In November 2010, Microsemi acquired Actel for $430 million. In May 2018, Microchip Technology acquired Microsemi.

== History and competition ==
Actel was founded in 1985 and became known for its high-reliability and anti-fuse-based FPGAs, used in the military and aerospace markets.

Actel acquired GateField in 2000, which expanded Actel's anti-fuse FPGA offering to include flash-based FPGAs. Actel announced in 2004 that it had shipped the one-millionth unit of its flash-based ProASIC^{PLUS} FPGA.

In 2005, Actel introduced a new technology known as Fusion to bring FPGA programmability to mixed-signal solutions. Fusion was the first technology to integrate mixed-signal analogue capabilities with flash memory and FPGA fabric in a monolithic device.

In 2006, to address the tight power budgets of the portable market, Actel introduced the IGLOO FPGA. The IGLOO family of FPGAs was based on Actel's nonvolatile flash technology and the ProASIC 3 FPGA architecture. Two new IGLOO derivatives were added in 2008: IGLOO PLUS FPGAs with enhanced I/O capabilities, and IGLOO nano FPGAs, a low power solution at 2 μW. A nano version of ProASIC3 also became available in 2008.

In 2010, Actel introduced the SmartFusion line of FPGAs. SmartFusion includes both analogue components and a programmable flash-based logic fabric within the same chip. SmartFusion was the first FPGA product to additionally include a hard ARM processor core.

Altera and Xilinx are the other key players in the market, however, their main focus is on SRAM FPGAs. Lattice Semiconductor is another competitor.

== Technologies ==
Actel's portfolio of FPGAs is based on two types of technologies: anti-fuse-based FPGAs (Axcelerator, SX-A, eX, and MX families) and flash-based FPGAs (Fusion, PolarFire, IGLOO, and ProASIC3 families).

Actel's anti-fuse FPGAs have been known for their nonvolatility, live-at power-up operation, single-chip form factor, and security. Actel's flash-based FPGA families include these same characteristics and are also reprogrammable and low power.

Actel also develops system-critical FPGAs (RTAX and ProASIC3 families), including extended temperature automotive, military, and aerospace FPGAs, plus a wide variety of space-class radiation-tolerant devices. These flash and anti-fuse FPGAs have high levels of reliability and firm-error immunity.

== Controversy ==
In March 2012, researchers from the University of Cambridge discovered a backdoor in the JTAG interface of the ProASIC3 family of low-powered FPGAs. They defended their theory at a cryptography workshop held in Belgium in September 2012.
