= Ambiq Micro =

American fabless semiconductor company

Ambiq Micro, Inc.
- Type: Public
- Traded as: NYSE: AMBQ
- Industry: Semiconductors
- Founded: 2010; 16 years ago
- Founders: Scott Hanson; David Blaauw; Dennis Sylvester
- Headquarters: Austin, Texas, United States
- Key people: Fumihide Esaka (CEO); Wen Hsieh (Chairman); Scott Hanson (CTO)
- Products: Microcontrollers (MCUs), systems-on-chip (SoCs), real-time clocks (RTCs)
- Revenue: ▼US$72.5 million (2025)
- Net income: ▲ −US$36.5 million (2025)
- Website: ambiq.com

Ambiq Micro, Inc. is an American semiconductor company specializing in low-power microcontrollers and systems-on-chip, including products for devices smartwatches, medical devices, and sensors. Founded in 2010 by University of Michigan researchers Scott Hanson, David Blaauw, and Dennis Sylvester, the company is headquartered in Austin, Texas. Its products employ Subthreshold Power Optimized Technology (SPOT) to reduce energy consumption and enable on-device edge AI. In 2025, Ambiq went public on the New York Stock Exchange.

== History ==
The company was established at the University of Michigan by professors Dennis Sylvester and David Blaauw and postdoctoral researcher Scott Hanson, who serves as the chief technology officer. Initially named Cubiq Microchip, Ambiq Micro spent several years developing its technology before creating its first commercially viable prototype.

Early on, the company participated in several business plan competitions. In 2010, it received awards at the Michigan Business Challenge and the DFJ-Cisco Global Business Plan Competition. It also secured pre-seed funding from the University of Michigan's Frankel Commercialization Fund.

In 2025, Ambiq Micro filed for an initial public offering on the New York Stock Exchange under the symbol AMBQ, with BofA Securities and UBS as lead underwriters. The company sold four million shares at $24 each, raising $96 million, and ended its first trading day with a market capitalization of $656 million.

== Products and technology ==
Ambiq commercializes Subthreshold Power Optimized Technology (SPOT), a design method that operates transistors near or below their threshold voltage to reduce active and sleep-mode power consumption, thereby enabling on-device edge AI. Its product line includes microcontrollers and systems-on-chip, called Apollo, as well as real-time clocks, called Artasie, which are used in smartwatches, medical devices, and industrial and agricultural sensors.

The company primarily serves the wearable technology market. Google, Garmin, and Huawei were its largest customers, together representing over 85% of pre-IPO revenue.
