= Energy Micro =

Defunct Norwegian semiconductor company

Energy Micro AS
- Type: Private
- Industry: Semiconductors, Electronics
- Founded: 2007; 19 years ago
- Founder: Geir Førre (CEO, co-founder)
- Defunct: 2013, June
- Fate: Acquired
- Headquarters: Oslo, Norway
- Products: Integrated Circuits, Microcontrollers
- Parent: Silicon Labs

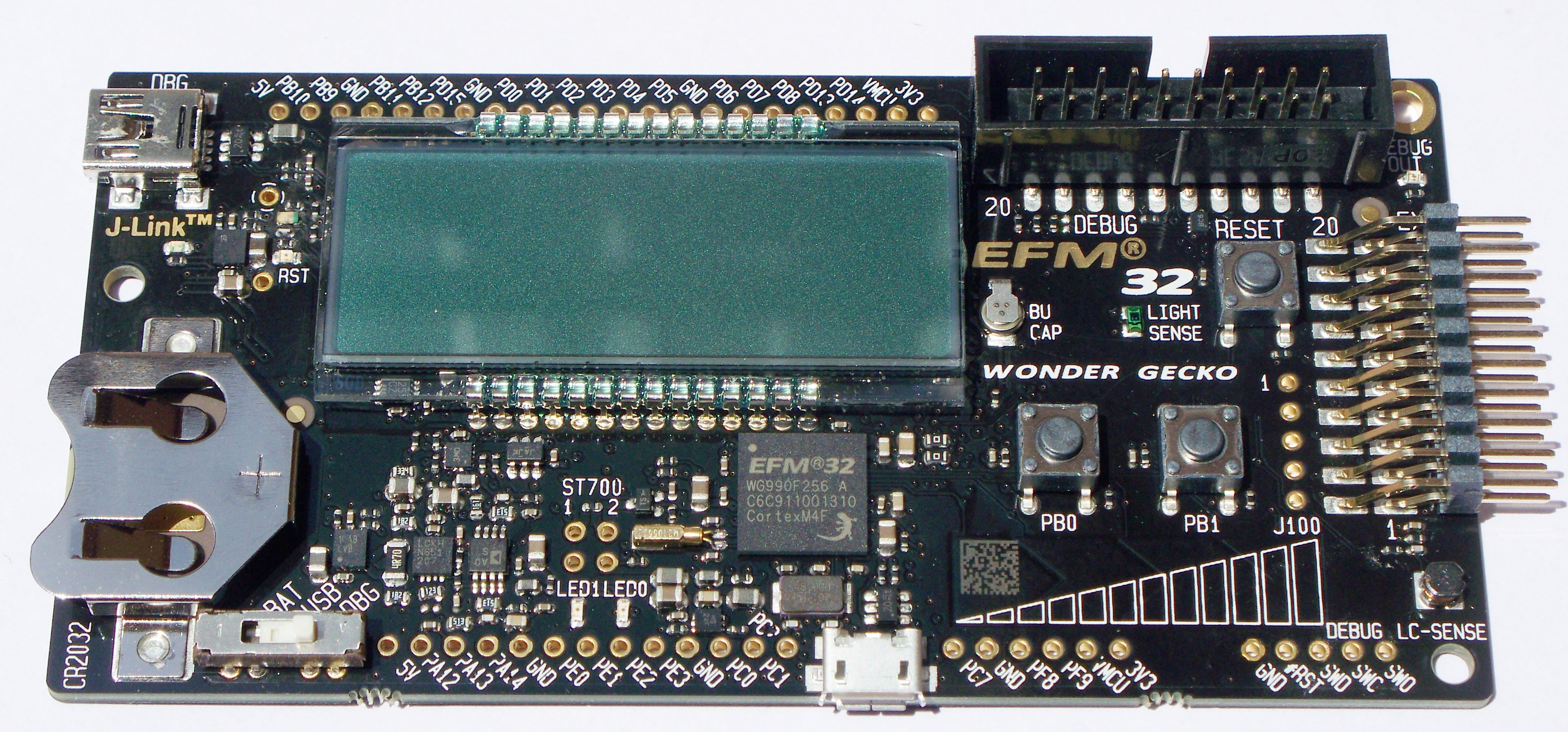
Energy Micro Wonder Gecko STK showing EFM32WG990F256 (ARM Cortex-M4F)

Energy Micro AS was a Norwegian fabless semiconductor company specializing in 32-bit RISC ARM chips. The company focused on ultra low energy consumption MCUs, SoC radios and RF Transceiver. Its EFM32 microcontroller families are based on the ARM Cortex-M0 or M3 processor core with a feature set for low power operation. It was acquired by Silicon Labs in 2013.

== History ==
Energy Micro was founded in 2007. The team consists of semiconductor experienced personnel where the President and CEO Geir Førre previously founded Chipcon, now a subsidiary of Texas Instruments. Co-founder and CTO Øyvind Janbu has experience from Chipcon, Texas Instruments, and Tandberg. Co-founder and the VP of Engineering, Eirik Jørgensen, has previously worked for Atmel. Co-founder and VP of Sales Operation, John Fjellheim, previously worked for Chipcon. In addition to the original founders the following individuals are now part of Energy Micro's management team; Andreas Koller joined from Texas Instruments as the VP of Worldwide Sales and Marketing, Zalina Shaher joined as the VP of Operations and she has former experience from Motorola and Silicon Laboratories, while Phi Hong joined as the VP of Finance.

Energy Micro's Board of Directors include Daniel Artusi, Daniel Hoste, both with several key positions in semiconductor companies. The Chairman is Torleif Ahlsand from Northzone Ventures, and Board Member Steinar Fossen from Investinor joined after the two VC companies invested a total of US$13 million in Energy Micro's first funding round.

On June 7, 2013, Energy Micro was acquired by Silicon Labs.

== See also ==
- EFM32
