= Microchip SmartFusion =

Family of FPGAs

SmartFusion is a family of microcontroller-class SoC FPGAs from Microchip Technology. The devices includes an ARM Cortex-M3 hard processor core in addition to their flash-based FPGA fabric.

== SmartFusion devices ==
Model number	FPGA Fabric			Microcontroller Subsystem (MSS)	
Model number	System Gates	Tiles (D-Flip-Flops)	RAM Blocks (4,608 bits)	Flash (KB)	SRAM (KB)
A2F200	200,000	4,608	8	256	64
A2F500	500,000	11,520	24	512	64

== SmartFusion2 devices ==
Model number	FPGA Fabric		Microcontroller Subsystem (MSS)	
Model number	Logic Elements	Total RAM (Kb)	Flash (KB)	SRAM (KB)
M2S005	6,060	191	128	64
M2S010	12,084	400	256	64
M2S025	27,696	592	256	64
M2S050	56,340	1314	256	64
M2S060	56,520	1314	256	64
M2S090	86,316	2074	512	64
M2S150	146,124	4488	512	64

== Development hardware ==
Microchip sells two development boards that include an SmartFusion chip. One is the SmartFusion Evaluation Kit which is a low cost board with a SmartFusion SoC A2F200. Another is the SmartFusion Development Kit which is a fully featured board with a SmartFusion SoC A2F500.

== Documentation ==
See External Links section for links to official SmartFusion documents and ARM documents.

== See also ==
- ARM architecture, List of ARM microprocessor cores, ARM Cortex-M
- Microcontroller, List of common microcontrollers
- Embedded system, Single-board microcontroller
- FPGA
