= Sitara ARM processor =

Computer processor developed by Texas Instruments

Sitara Arm MPU

General information
- Marketed by: Texas Instruments
- Designed by: Texas Instruments
- Common manufacturer: Texas Instruments

Performance
- Max. CPU clock rate: 450 MHz AM18x to 1.5 GHz AM57x

Physical specifications
- Cores: 1

Architecture and classification
- Instruction set: ARMv7 and ARMv8

The Sitara Arm Processor family, developed by Texas Instruments, features ARM9, ARM Cortex-A8, ARM Cortex-A9, ARM Cortex-A15, and ARM Cortex-A53 application cores, C66x DSP cores, imaging and multimedia acceleration cores, industrial communication IP, and other technology to serve a broad base of applications. Development using Sitara processors is supported by the open source Beagle community as well as Texas Instruments' open source development community.

== Products featuring Sitara Arm ==
- Nest, a learning thermostat
- Netgate SG-1000, a micro firewall based on pfSense
- MOD/MOD Live, makes GPS-enabled Micro Optics Displays (MOD) for snow goggles
- BeagleBone Black single board computer
- BeagleBoard-X15 single board computer
- Lego Mindstorms EV3 – Lego Mindstorms EV3 bricks use the ARM9 TI Sitara AM1x

== The Sitara family ==
Sitara Arm processors available today include:

Model number	Core	DMIPs	GPU	Memory	OS	Features	Applications	Pricing	Datasheet
AM18x	ARM9 up to 456 MHz	Up to 410	N/A	LPDDR1/DDR2	Linux, StarterWare, WinCE	LCD controller, SATA, video in/out, 10/100 Mbit/s EMAC, USB w/PHY	Smart meter, Wi-Fi router	Starting at $4.55 (10K)	http://www.ti.com/lit/ds/symlink/am1808.pdf
AM243x	up to two dual 800 MHz ARM Cortex-R5F plus one 400 MHz Arm Cortex-M4F	Up to 6000	none	2MB of On-chip RAM, plus external LPDDR4, DDR4	NoRTOS or RTOS	two Gigabit Ethernet, USB3, PCIe, etc.	performance microcontroller for Motor Drives, Remote I/O, Industrial Robots, etc.	$9.879 to $18.46 (1ku)	https://www.ti.com/lit/ds/symlink/am2434.pdf
AM335x	ARM Cortex-A8 up to 1 GHz	Up to 2000	SGX530	LPDDR1/DDR2/ DDR3/DDR3L	Linux, Android, StarterWare, WinCE, FreeBSD, OpenBSD	LCD Controller, 10/100/1000 Mbit/s EMAC, 2xCAN, USB OTG w/PHY, 2xPRU-ICSS	PND, Connected home, industrial automation	Starting at $4.96 (1ku)	http://www.ti.com/lit/ds/symlink/am3358.pdf
AM35x	ARM Cortex-A8 up to 600 MHz	Up to 1200	SGX530	LPDDR1/DDR2	Linux, Android, WinCE	display subsystem, video in/out, 10/100/1000 Mbit/s EMAC, CAN, USB w/PHY	IA, PLC, Infotainment	Starting at $12.25 (10K)	http://www.ti.com/lit/ds/symlink/am3517.pdf
AM37x	ARM Cortex-A8 up to 1 GHz	Up to 2000	SGX530	LPDDR1	Linux, Android, WinCE	display subsystem, video in/out, PoP packaging, USB, lowest power	PND, ed. tablet, PDT	Starting at $12.25 (10K)	http://www.ti.com/lit/ds/symlink/am3715.pdf
AM437x	ARM Cortex-A9 up to 1 GHz	Up to 2500	SGX530	LPDDR2/DDR3/DDR3L	Linux, TI-RTOS, Android, VxWorks, WinCE, Neutrino, Integrity	10/100/1000 Mbit/s Ethernet Switch w/2 Ports, 4xPRU-ICSS Dual camera support, Secure boot	Industrial automation, Patient monitoring, Navigation equipment, Point of Service,	Starting at $9 for 1ku	http://www.ti.com/lit/ds/symlink/am4379.pdf
AM57x	dual ARM Cortex-A15 up to 1.5 GHz dual C66x DSP up to 750 MHz quad ARM Cortex-M4s for image processing and general purpose up to 212 MHz	Up to 10500	dual SGX544	DDR3/DDR3L	RISC OS, Linux, TI-RTOS, Android, WinCE	10/100/1000 Mbit/s Ethernet Switch w/2 Ports, 4xPRU-ICSS (100 Mbps Ethernet) multiple Video Input Ports (parallel or CSI), USB 3.0, PCIe, SATA, and Secure Boot	Analytics, vision, embedded computing, HMI, industrial automation, industrial drives, industrial control, robotics, medical imaging, avionics	Starting at $28 for 1ku	http://www.ti.com/lit/ds/symlink/am5728.pdf
AM62x,	single, dual or quad ARM Cortex-A53 up to 1.4 GHz, ARM Cortex-M4F up to 400 MHz	Up to 12880	500 MHz (only AM625x)	DDR4/LPDDR4/DDR3L up to 32 GB with ECC	Linux, TI-RTOS, Android	2x 10/100/1000 Mbit/s Ethernet, 2x PRU (only AM62xxAxC), MIPI-CSI, 2x DPI/LVDS	Embedded computing, HMI, retail automation, automotive, appliance user interface and connectivity, medical equipment	preview status	https://www.ti.com/lit/gpn/am623, https://www.ti.com/lit/gpn/am625
AM65x	dual or quad ARM Cortex-A53 up to 1.1 GHz, dual ARM Cortex-R5F up to 400 MHz in isolated safety domain	Up to 10120	SGX544	DDR4/LPDDR4/DDR3L up to 32 GB with ECC	Linux, TI-RTOS, Android	10/100/1000 Mbit/s Ethernet Port, 3x PRU-ICSSG (6x Gigabit Ethernet), PCIe Gen3, USB 3.0, and embedded Device Management Security Controller (DMSC) with Secure Boot	Embedded computing, HMI, industrial automation, industrial drives, industrial control, robotics, motor control, grid infrastructure, data concentrator	preview status	https://www.ti.com/lit/gpn/am6548

== See also ==
- TI OMAP (Open Multimedia Applications Platform) SoC family
