= DVPB-HD =

Technological prototyping board in Texas, United States

DVPB-HD (Digital Video Processing Board - High Definition) is a prototyping board based on Texas Instruments DaVinci Technology.

It has many of the required peripheral interfaces support such as:

- CVBS
- Component Video
- HDMI
- Audio
- Giga-Bit Ethernet
- RS-232
- RS-485
- USB 2.0
- VLYNQ
- HDD
- RTC
- UART/IrDA
- PCI
- SPI
- GPIO

This board is provided by Texas Instruments' 3rd Party Partner, Einfochips

== Features ==
- Montavista Linux 2.6.10
- 4 Channel SD or 1 Channel HD
- RoHS Compliant

== Possible application areas ==
- Video encoding and transcoding
- Video surveillance
- Video gateways
- Video conferencing
- Medical imaging
