= CCS4 =

CCS4 can refer to:

- Code Composer Studio version 4, an integrated development environment for embedded systems by Texas Instruments
- TC LID code for Chipman Airport (New Brunswick), Canada
