= CCS3 =

CCS3 can refer to:

- Code Composer Studio version 3, an integrated development environment for embedded systems by Texas Instruments
- TC LID code for St. Stephen Airport
