= Spy-Bi-Wire =

Spy-Bi-Wire is a serialized JTAG protocol developed by Texas Instruments for their MSP430 microcontrollers.

To avoid dedicating four pins as required by the general JTAG interface, the Spy-Bi-Wire protocol only uses two: one for bidirectional data, and one for the clock signal. Time-division multiplexing is used to share the data pin by alternating usage of the pin during each clock pulse in a round-robin fashion: the first clock pulse is a time slot for "Test Mode Select" (TMS), the second clock pulse is a slot for "Test Data In" (TDI), and the third clock pulse is a slot for "Test Data Out" (TDO).
