= EXpressDSP =

eXpressDSP is a software package produced by Texas Instruments (TI). This software package is a suite of tools used to develop applications on Texas Instruments digital signal processor line of chips.

It consists of:

- An integrated development environment called Code Composer Studio IDE.
- DSP/BIOS Real-Time OS kernel
- Standards for application interoperability and reuse
- Code examples for common applications, called the eXpressDSP Reference Frameworks
- A number of third-party products from TI's DSP Third Party Program

== eXpressDSP Algorithm Interface Standard ==
TI publishes an eXpressDSP Algorithm Interface Standard (XDAIS), an Application Programming Interface (API) designed to enable interoperability of real-time DSP algorithms.
