= TMS320 =

Series of Digital Signal Processor chips

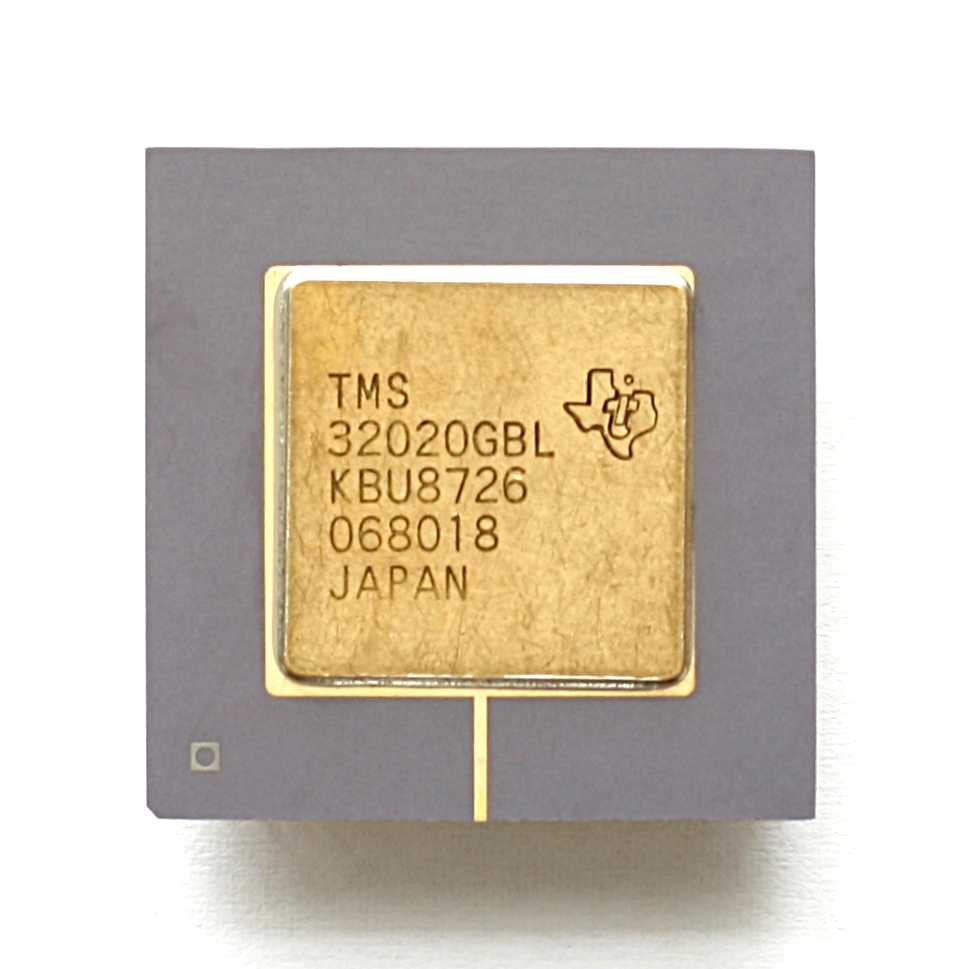
Texas Instruments TMS32020

TMS320 is a blanket name for a series of digital signal processors (DSPs) from Texas Instruments. It was introduced on April 8, 1983, through the TMS32010 processor, which was then the fastest DSP on the market.

The processor is available in many different variants, some with fixed-point arithmetic and some with floating-point arithmetic. The TMS320 processors were fabricated on MOS integrated circuit chips, including both NMOS and CMOS variants. The floating-point DSP TMS320C3x, which exploits delayed branch logic, has as many as three delay slots.

This series of processors are used as a digital signal processing co-processor and as the main CPU in some applications. Newer implementations support standard IEEE JTAG control for boundary scan and/or in-circuit debugging.

The original TMS32010 and its subsequent variants are an example of a CPU with a modified Harvard architecture, which features separate address spaces for instruction and data memory but the ability to read data values from instruction memory. The TMS32010 featured a fast multiply-and-accumulate operation useful in both DSP applications as well as transformations used in computer graphics. The graphics controller card for the Apollo Computer DN570 Workstation, released in 1985, was based on the TMS32010 and could transform 20,000 2D vectors per second.

== Variants ==
The TMS320 architecture has been around for a while so a number of product variants have developed. The product codes used by Texas Instruments after the first TMS32010 processor have involved a series of processor named "TMS320Cabcd", where a is the main series, b the generation and cd is some custom number for a minor sub-variant.

For this reason, those working with DSPs often abbreviate a processor as "C5x" when the actual name is, for example, TMS320C5510, since all products have the name "TMS320", and all processors with "C5" in the name are code compatible and share the same basic features. Similarly, a subgrouping may be referred to as, for example, C55x, as processors in the same series and generation are even more similar.

TMS320 processors are fabricated on MOS integrated circuit chips, including both NMOS and CMOS variants.

=== Nomenclature ===
TMS prefix indicates that the processor is a fully qualified production device. Other possible prefixes are TMX or TMP which are used for prototype variants. Following 320 is simply the device family, completing to the TMS320 MCU Family.

=== Legacy series ===
- TMS320C1x, first generation 16-bit fixed-point DSPs. All processors in these series are code-compatible with the TMS32010
  - TMS32010, the very first processor in the first series introduced in 1983, using external memory
  - TMS320M10, the same processor but with an internal ROM of 3 KB
  - TMS320C10, TMS320C15, TMS320C25, etc
- TMS320C2x, second generation 16-bit fixed-point DSPs. All processors in these series are object-code compatible with the TMS32020 and source-code compatible with the TMS32010
  - TMS32020, first processor in the second series
  - TMS320C25, 40 MHz CMOS version with greatly enhanced feature set
  - TMS320C25-50, 50 MHz version of the TMS320C25
  - TMS320C26, identical to the TMS320C25, except without the 4K-word ROM
  - TMS320E25, identical to the TMS320C25, except with EPROM used for the 4K-word on-chip program store rather than ROM
- TMS320C3x, 32-bit floating point
  - TMS320C30, 27 to 50 MHz, 8 KB internal SRAM, 5 Volt
  - TMS320C31, 27 to 60 MHz, 8 KB internal SRAM, 5 Volt, subset of TMS320C30 by removing 2nd serial port, removing 2nd memory bus, replacing user ROM with factory ROM bootloader
  - TMS320LC31, 33 to 40 MHz, 3.3 Volt version of TMS320C31
  - TMS320C32, 40 to 60 MHz, 2 KB internal SRAM, 5 Volt, adds 2nd DMA coprocessor, changes external memory bus to allow 8/16/32-bit wide memory access where as other C3x parts are 32-bit only
  - TMS320VC33, 60 to 75 MHz, 136 KB internal SRAM, 3.3 Volt I/O with 1.8 Volt Core, superset of TMS320C31 by adding 128KB internal SRAM
- TMS320C4x, 32-bit floating point
  - TMS320C40, 40/50/60/80 MHz, cycle time 50/40/33/25 ns, CMOS, is equipped with three branch delay slots and supports both delayed and non-delayed branch instructions.
  - TMS320C44, subset of TMS320C40
- TMS320C8x, multiprocessor chip
  - TMS320C80 MVP (multimedia video processor) has a 32 bit floating-point "master processor" and four 32-bit fixed-point "slave processors".

=== C2000 series ===
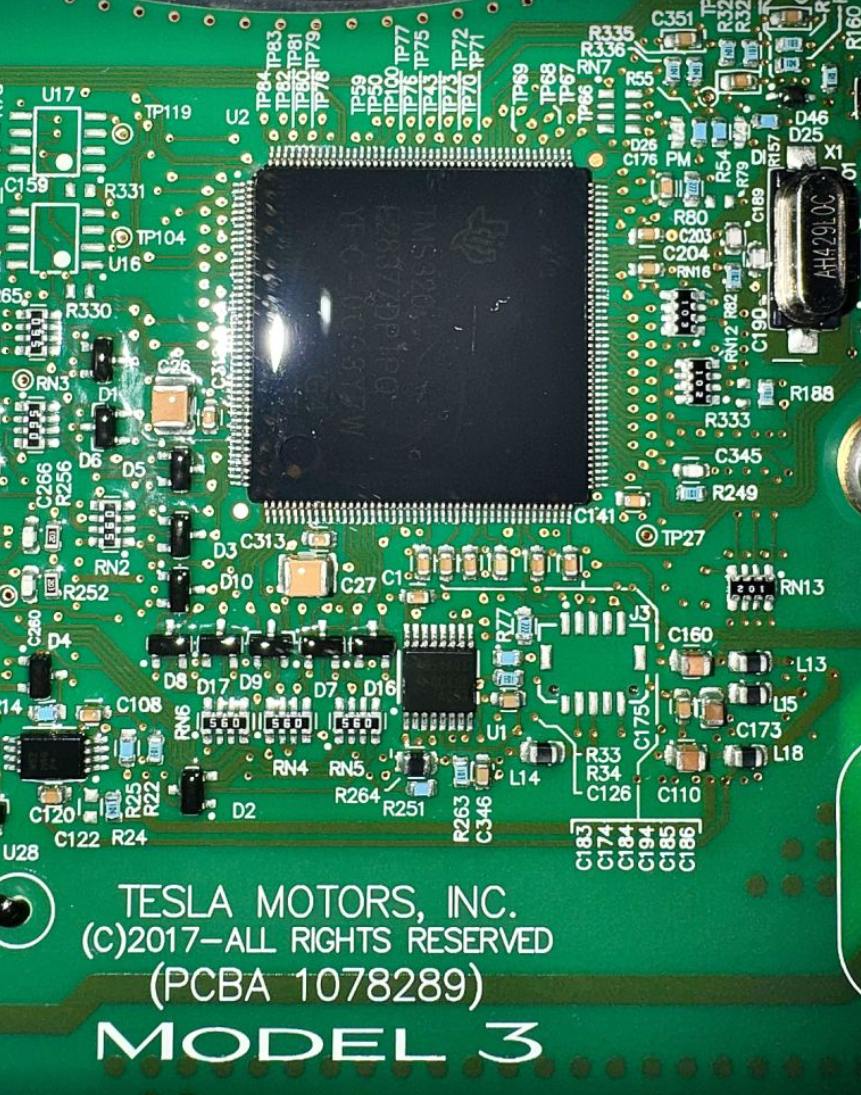
TMS320F28377DPTPQ (C28x) inside a Tesla Model 3 Drive Inverter.

The C2000 microcontroller family (C28x) is a group of 32-bit microcontrollers designed for real-time control applications.

These microcontrollers integrate peripherals commonly used in control systems, such as PWM, ADC, and quadrature encoder modules. They support communication interfaces such as I²C, SPI, serial, CAN.

Features such as PWM and high-resolution PWM (HRPWM) make the C2000 family suitable for control tasks including motor control and drives, industrial automation, and power systems.

=== C5000 series ===
- TMS320C54x 16-bit fixed-point DSP, 6 stage pipeline with in-order-execution of opcodes, parallel load/store on arithmetic operations, multiply accumulate and other DSP enhancements. Internal multi-port memory. no cache unit.
  - A popular choice for 2G Software defined cellphone radios, particularly GSM, circa late 1990s when many Nokia and Ericsson cell phones made use of the C54x.
  - At the time, desire to improve the user interface of cellphones led to the adoption of ARM7 as a general-purpose processor for user interface and control, off-loading this function from the DSP. This ultimately led to the creation of a dual core ARM7+C54x DSP, which later evolved into the OMAP product line.
- TMS320C55x generation – fixed-point, runs C54x code but adds more internal parallelism (another ALU, dual MAC, more memory bandwidth) and registers, while supporting much lower power operation.
  - Today, most C55x DSPs are sold as discrete chips
  - OMAP1 chips combine an ARM9 (ARMv5TEJ) with a C55x series DSP.
  - OMAP2420 chips combine an ARM11 (ARMv6) with a C55x series DSP.

=== C6000 series ===
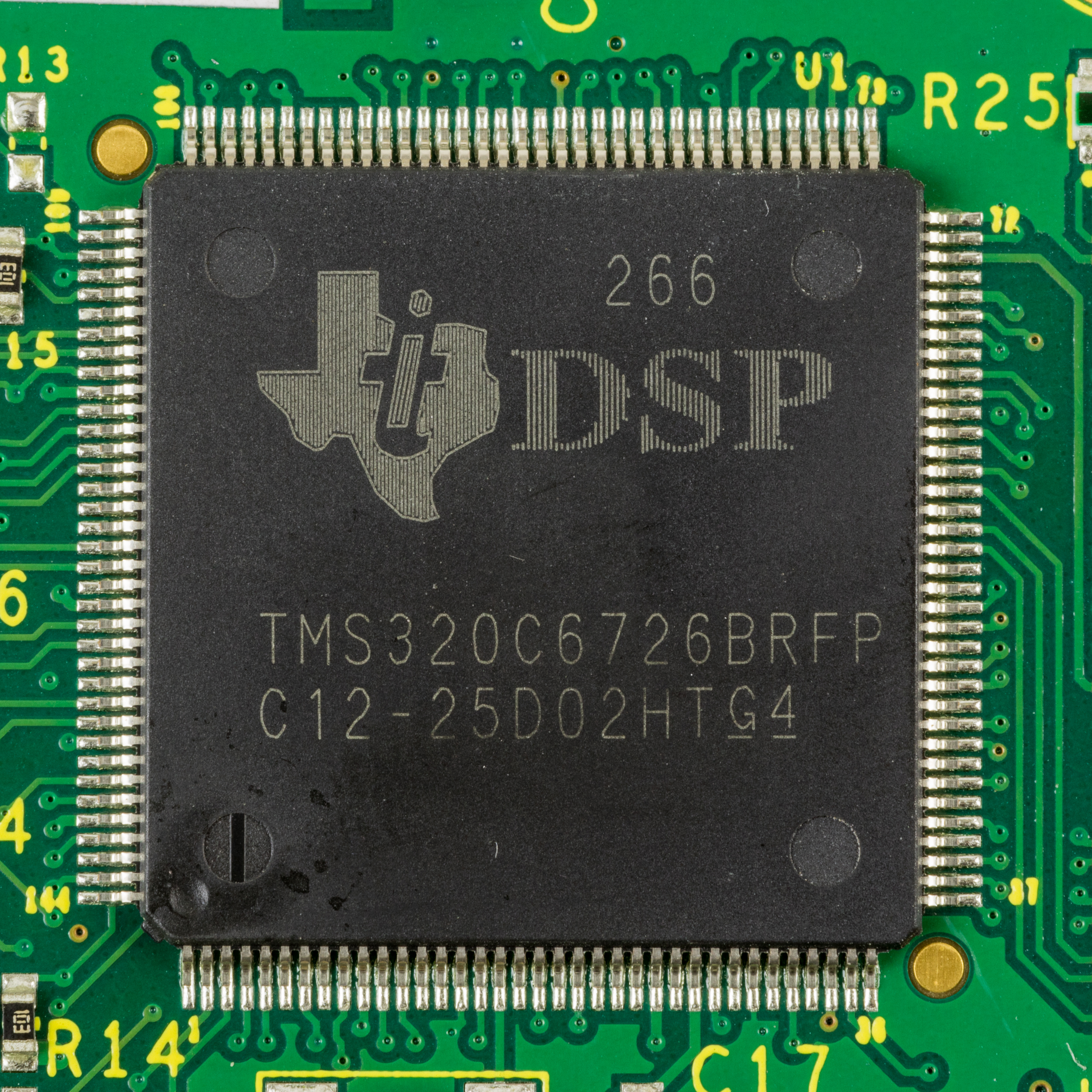
Texas Instruments TMS320C6726BRFP

- TMS320 C6000 series, or TMS320C6x: VLIW-based DSPs
  - TMS320C62x fixed-point – 2000 MIPS/1.9 W
  - TMS320C67x floating point – code compatible with TMS320C62x
  - TMS320C64x fixed-point – code compatible with TMS320C62x
  - TMS320C67x+ floating point – architectural update of TMS320C67x
  - TMS320C64x+ fixed-point – major architectural update of TMS320C64x
  - TMS320C674x fixed- and floating point – merger of C64x+ and C67x+
  - TMS320C66x fixed- and floating point – backwards compatible with C674x
- Other parts with C6000 series DSPs include
  - DaVinci chips include one or both of an ARM9 and a C64x+ or C674x DSP
  - OMAP-L13x chips include an ARM9 (ARMv5TEJ) and a C674x fixed and floating point DSP
  - OMAP243x chips combine an ARM11 (ARMv6) with a C64x series DSP
  - OMAP3 chips include an ARM Cortex-A8 (ARMv7) with a C64x+ DSP
  - OMAP4 and OMAP5 chips include an ARM Cortex-A9 or A15 (ARMv7) with a custom C64x+ derivative known as Tesla (or C64T)

=== C7000 series ===
The C7000 series was released in early 2020, but cores are not available individually. As of November 2026, they are only available bundled inside other SOCs, such as the TDA4VM, which features a C71x DSP. Available versions include C71x (C7100 and C7120) and C75x (C7504 and C7524).

=== DaVinci series ===
- The DaVinci series started with systems-on-a-chip using an embedded C6000 series (C64x+) DSP, ARM9 application processors, and Digital Media peripherals. There are variants without ARMs, and without DSPs. Their marketing focuses on their video processing capabilities. Original chips supported NTSC and PAL, while newer ones support HDTV.

=== OMAP variants ===
- OMAP variants also have an ARM processor in the same chip; see the main article on Texas Instruments OMAP. (There are also OMAP processors with other secondary processors, so these are not necessarily DSPs.)

=== DA variants ===
- DA variants (target "Digital audio")
  - DA25x is an ARM processor and a C55x core. It has some on-chip peripherals like a USB slave controller and security features. Documentation of this chip is only available after signing a Texas Instruments NDA. These variants are used exclusively in the Creative ZEN and Dell Digital Jukebox MP3 players, as the primary CPU and signal processor for all processing of MP3 data streams.
  - TMS320DA7xx Aureus chips are built around C67x+ DSPs
  - DA830/DA828 Aureus chips are based on the OMAP-L137, and include a 300 MHz C674x DSP and a 300 MHz ARM926ES-J core. The DA828 variant has reduced I/O and comes in a 176-pin TQFP package instead of a 256-ball PBGA.
  - DA610/601 is a processor with a C67x core. It has on chip peripherals needed to connect to audio codecs for a 5.1 or 7.1 system. This chip is used in the YAMAHA high end receivers : RX-V1400, RX-V2400, RX-V1600, RX-V2600, RX-V2500.

=== DM variants ===
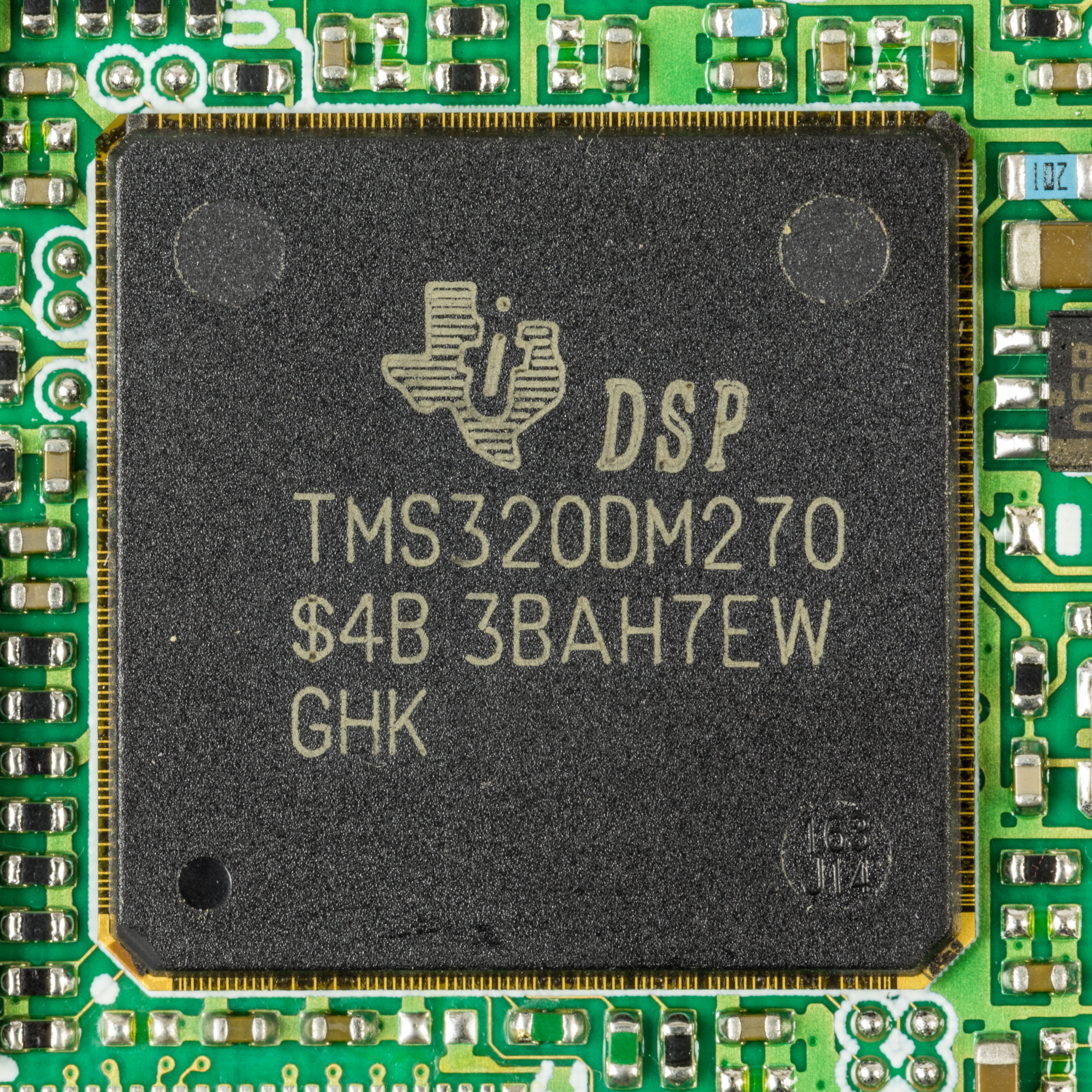
- Texas Instruments TMS320DM270
  DM variants:
  - DM270 has an ARM7TDMI core and a TMS320 C5409 DSP
  - DM320 has an ARM926 core and a TMS320 C5409 DSP
  - DSC25 has an ARM7TDMI core and a TMS320 DSP
  - Texas Instruments DaVinci chips

=== Other vendors ===
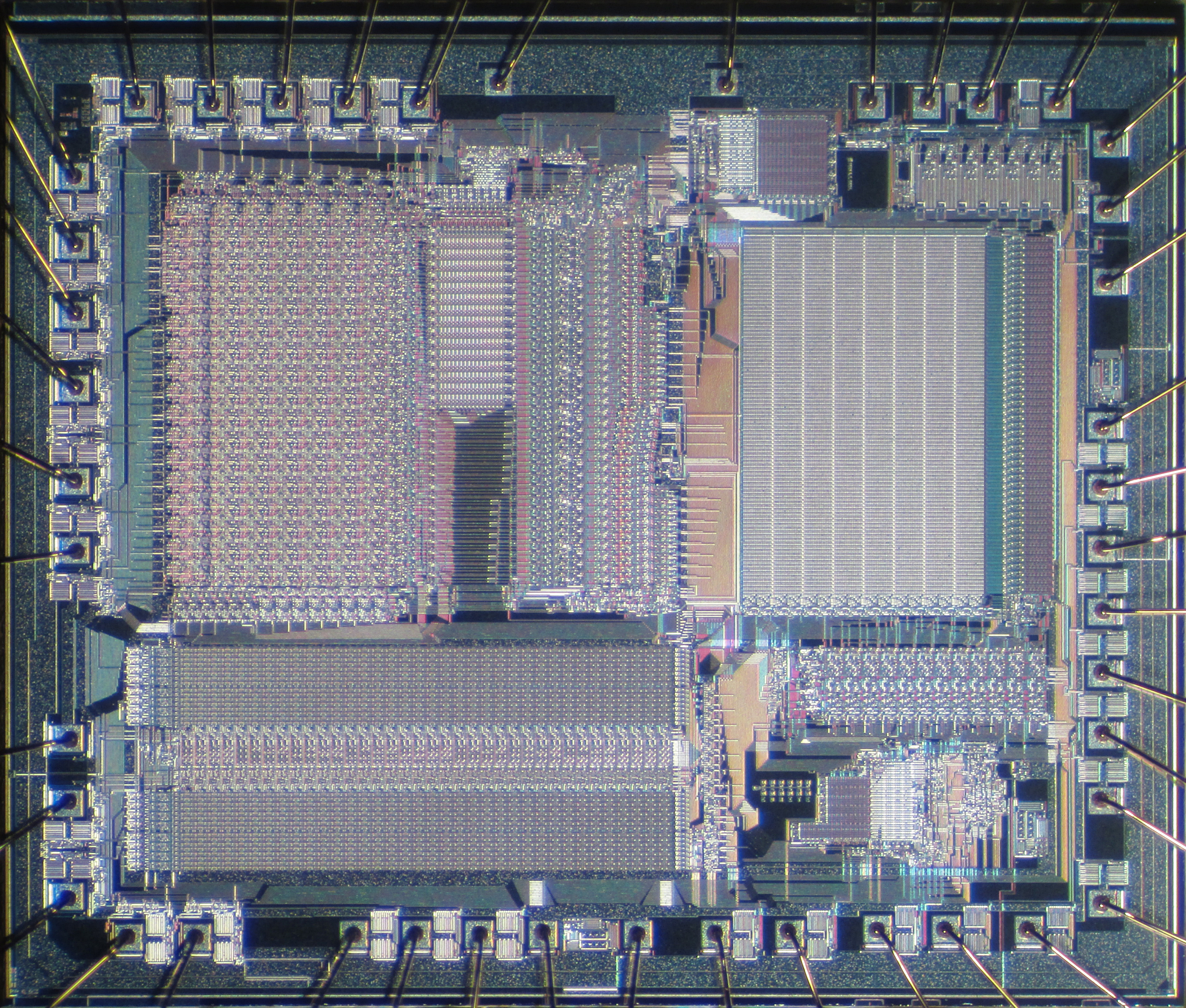
Die of the General Instrument DSP32010

General Instrument manufactured the TMS32010 as a second source.

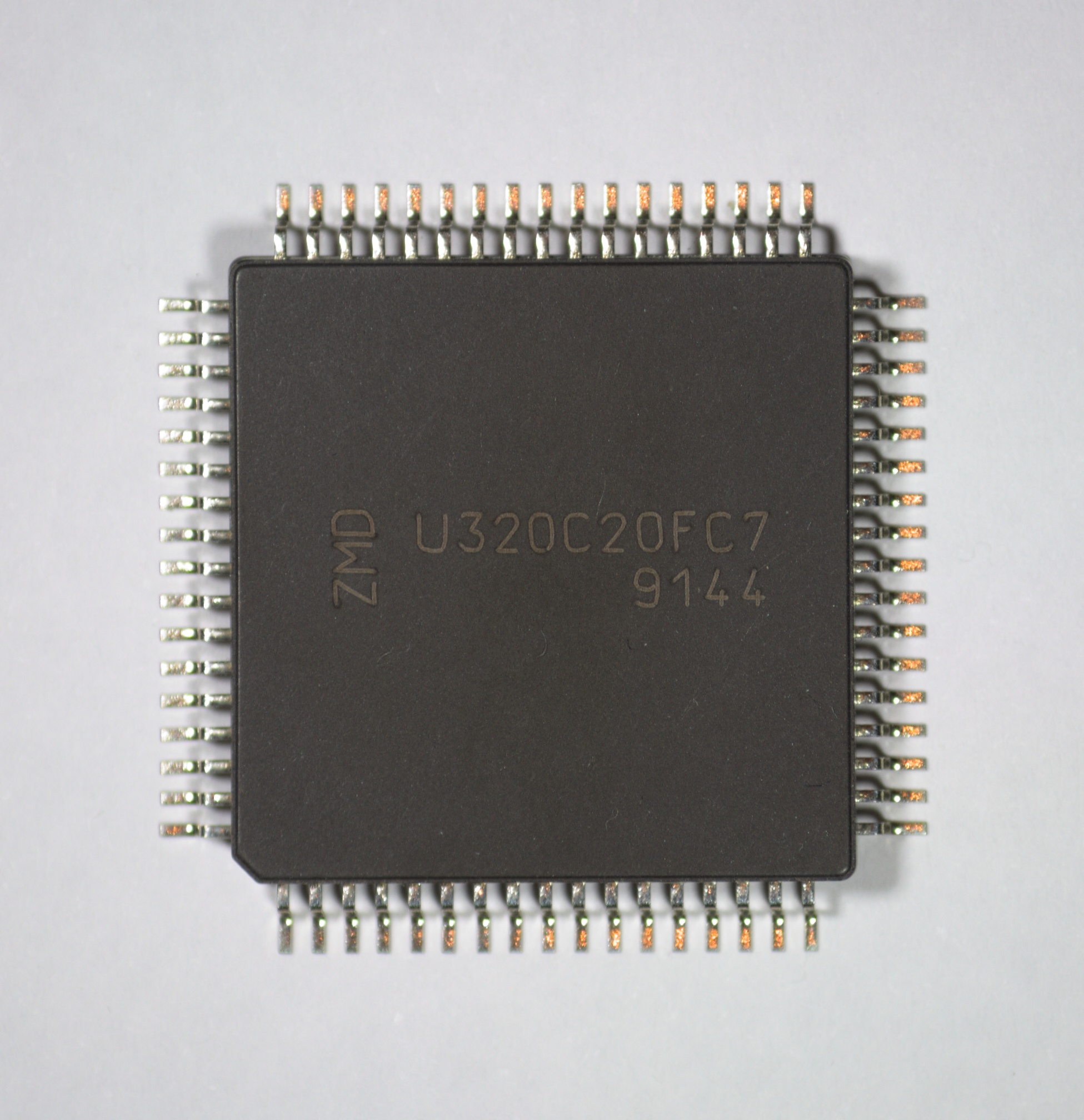
ZMD U320C20FC

Around 1991, a CMOS-version of the TMS32020 was manufactured by ZMD under the designation U320C20FC.

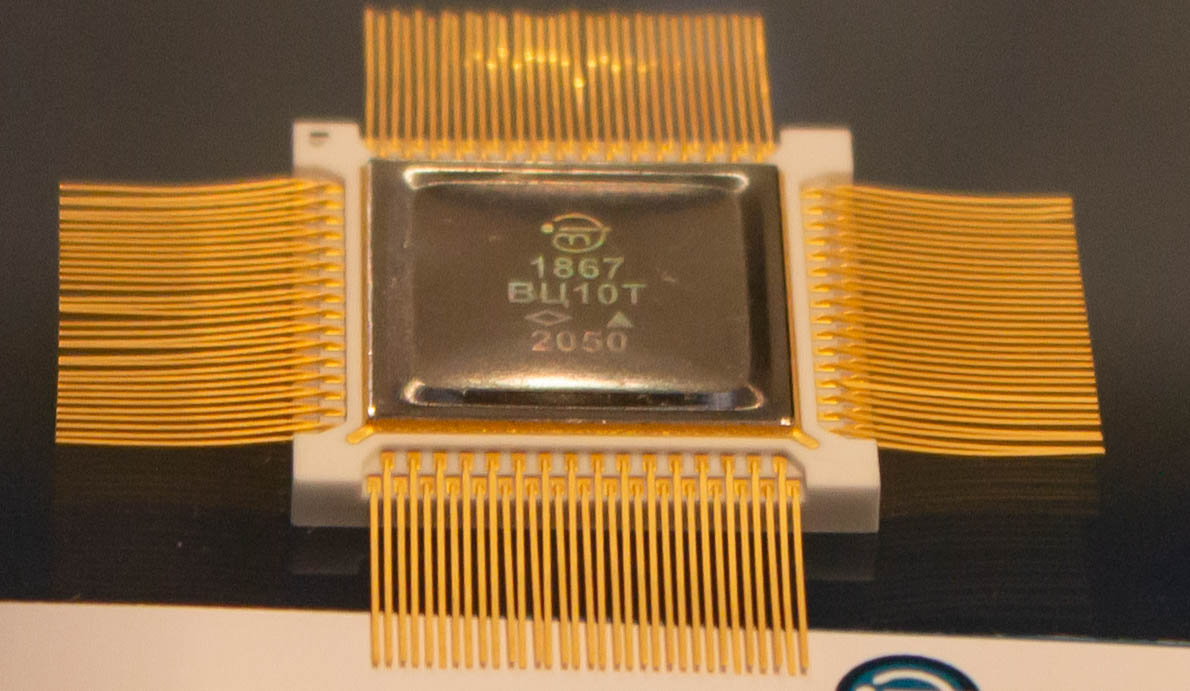
NIIET 1867VC10T

A number of devices from the TMS320 series are in production at NIIET Voronezh as the 1867 series, including a radiation-hardened version of the TMS320C25 under the designation 1867VM7T (Russian: 1867ВМ7Т). Clones of the TMS320C546 went into production at PKK Milandr Moscow in 2009 under the designation 1967VC1T (Russian: 1967ВЦ1Т) and in 2016 at MVC Nizhny Novgorod as 1910VM1T (Russian: 1910ВМ1Т). PKK Milandr also manufactures a TMS320C54x with an additional ARM core as the 1901VC1T (Russian: 1901ВЦ1Т).

== Software support ==
The TMS320 series can be programmed using C, C++, and/or assembly language. Most work on the TMS320 processors is done using Texas Instruments proprietary toolchain and their integrated development environment Code Composer Studio, which includes a mini operating system called DSP/BIOS. Additionally, a department at the Chemnitz University of Technology has developed preliminary support for the TMS320C6x series in the GNU Compiler Collection.

In November 2007, TI released part of its toolchain as freeware for non-commercial users, offering the bare compiler, assembler, optimizer and linker under a proprietary license. However, neither the IDE nor a debugger were included, so for debugging and JTAG access to the DSPs, users still need to purchase the complete toolchain.

In 2010, Texas Instruments contracted CodeSourcery (the assignment later transferred to Mentor Graphics as part of their acquisition) to provide deep integration and support for the C6x series in GCC, as part of their effort to port the Linux kernel to C6x. This culminated in C6x being a supported architecture in GCC release 4.7 on March 22, 2012.

== See also ==
- XDAIS algorithms
- Ceva
- Qualcomm Hexagon
