= TI MSP430 =

Mixed-signal microcontroller family

- Designer: Texas Instruments
- Bits: 16-bit
- Introduced: 14 February 1992
- Type: Memory–Memory
- Endianness: little endian
- Extensions: MSP430X

Registers
- 16 registers, R0 – Program Counter, R1 – Stack Pointer, R2 – Status Register, R2/R3 – Constant Generator, R4 through R15 are general purpose

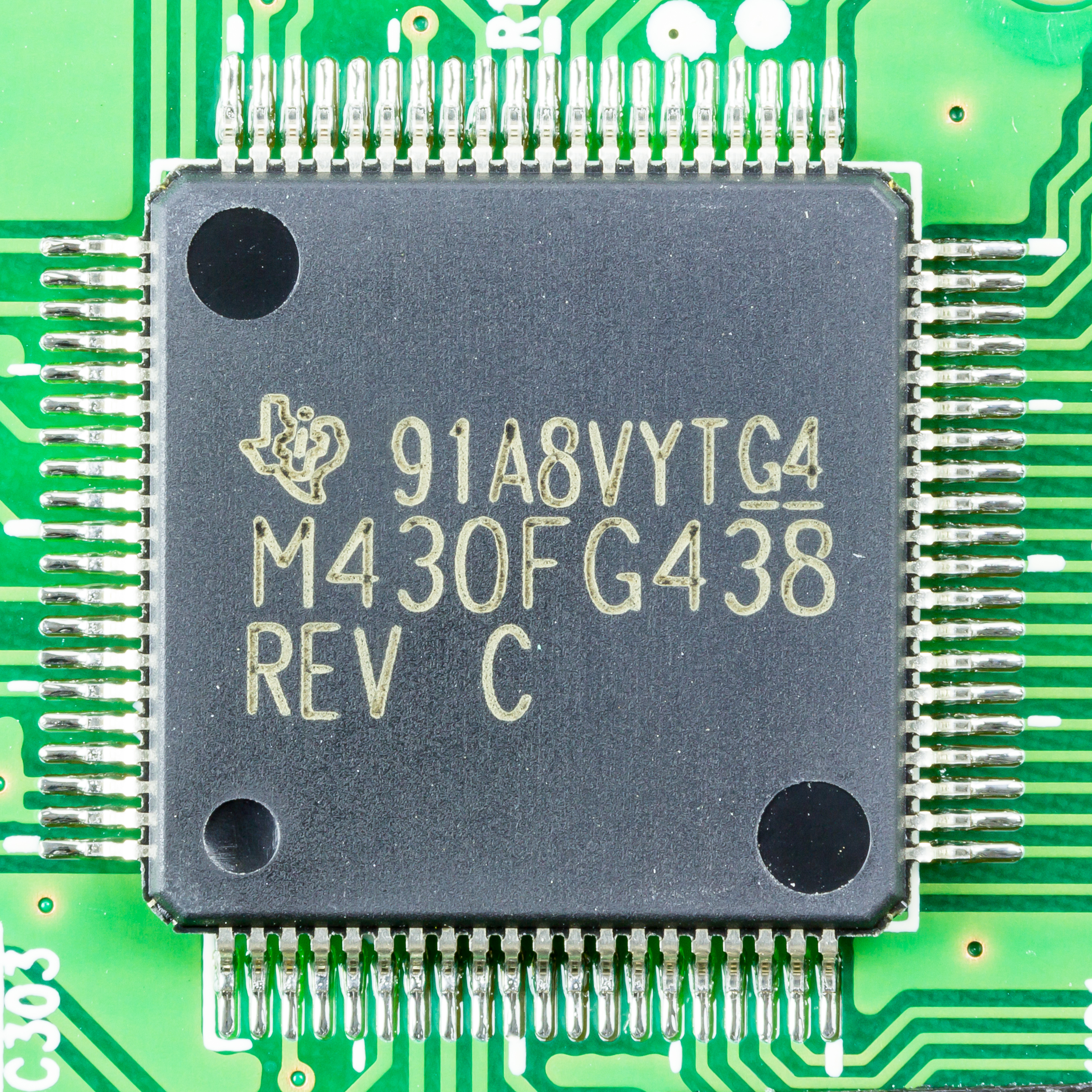
MSP 430 FG438 driving a glucose meter

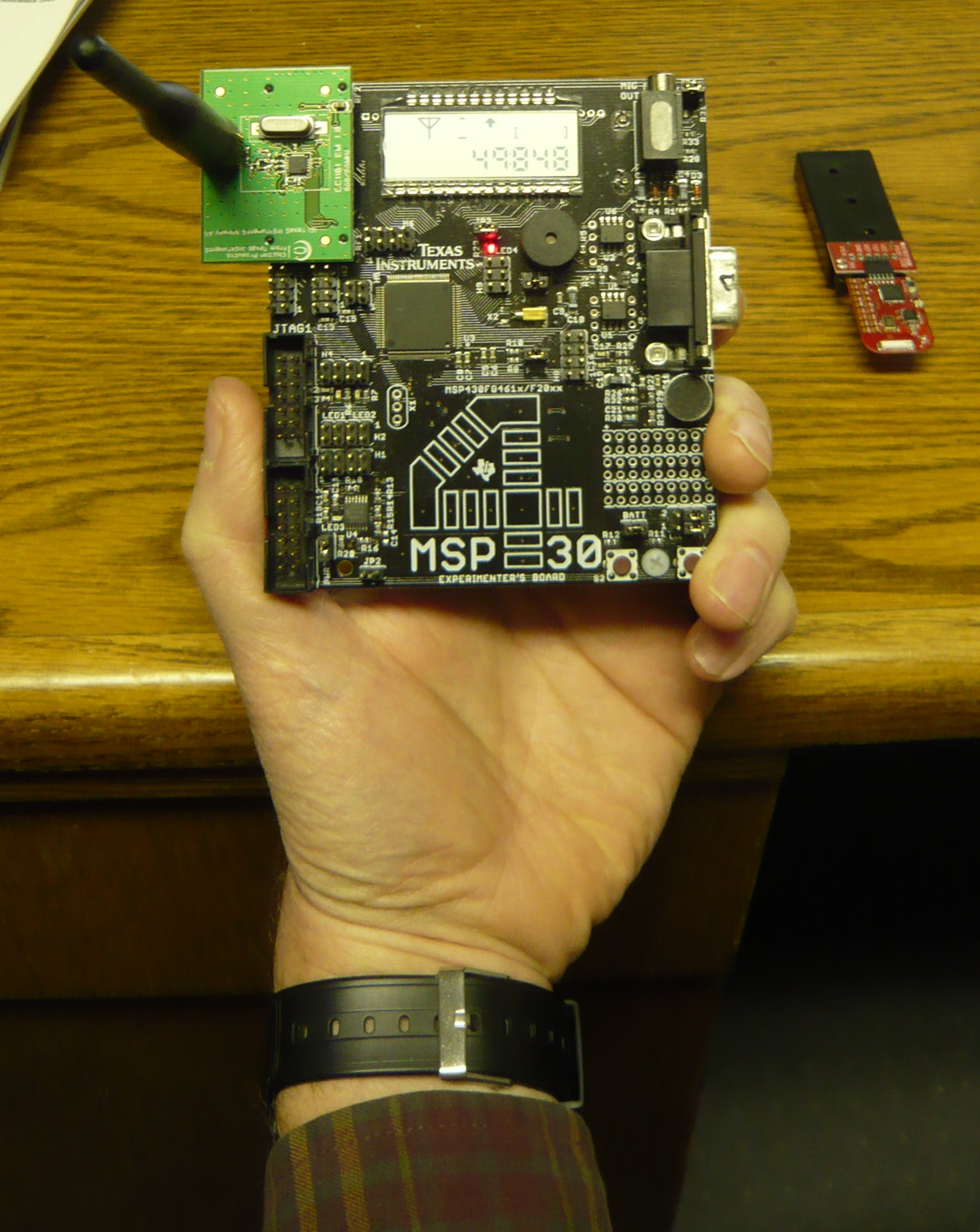
Photo of two experimenter boards for the MSP430 chipset by Texas Instruments. On the left the larger chip version, on the right a small version in USB format.

The MSP430 is a mixed-signal microcontroller family from Texas Instruments, first introduced on 14 February 1992. Built around a 16-bit CPU, the MSP430 was designed for low power consumption, embedded applications and low cost.

== Features ==
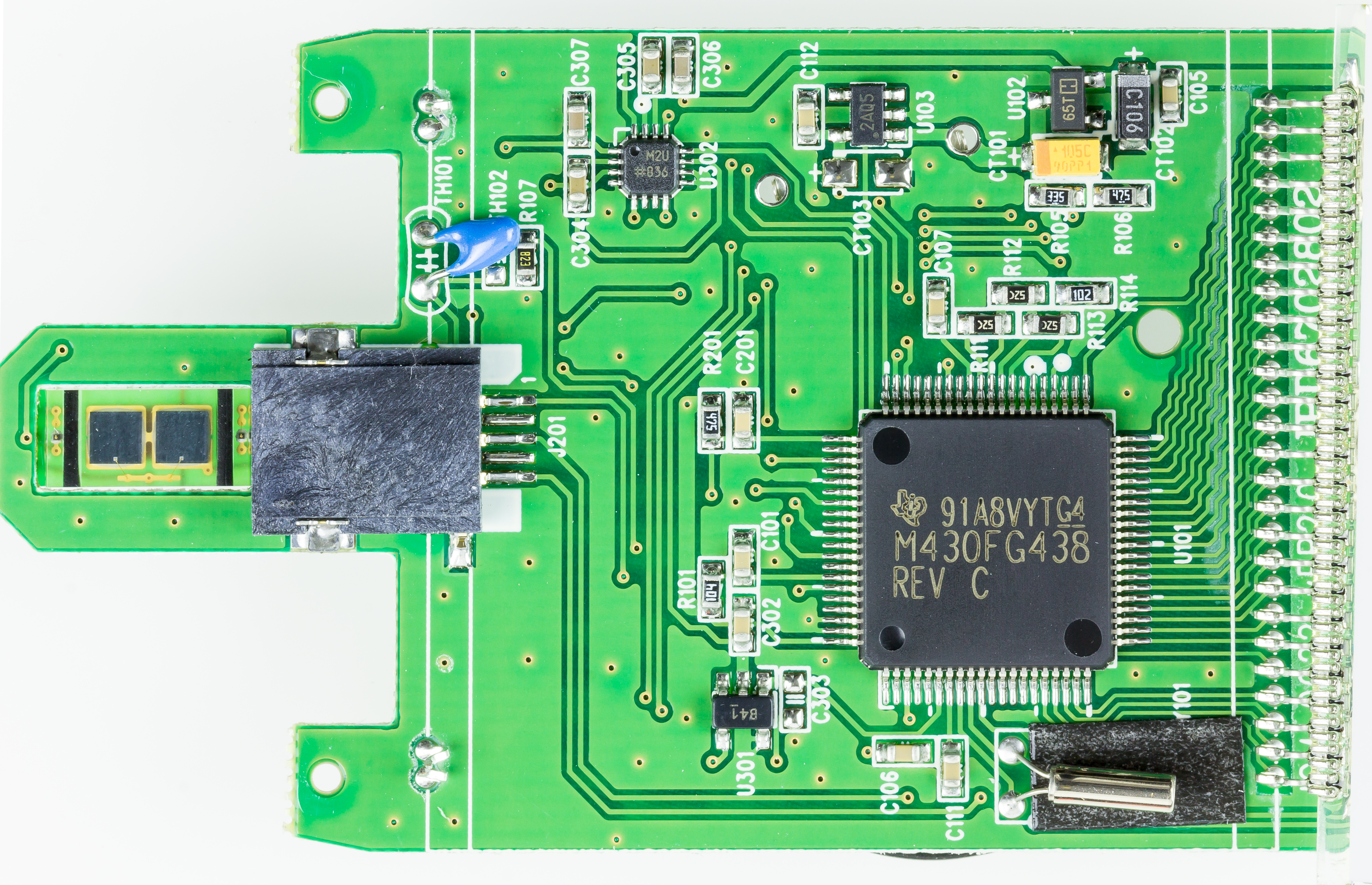
Aktivmed GlucoCheck Comfort glucose meter – Printed circuit board below the LCD hosting an MSP 430 CPU

The fundamental feature of the MSP430 is low power consumption. The first MSP430s (MSP430C3xx) had a consumption around 400 uA/MHz and less than 2 uA in low-power mode with active basic timer and LCD driver. The more recent MSPs (MSP430FR5xx) have active mode consumption around 100-120 uA/MHz and 500 nA in low-power mode with active RTC. The consumption of the CPU itself is less than 32 uA/MHz. The MSP430FR series, which use FRAM instead of a flash, also allow fast writing to a non-volatile memory without additional power requirements.

The MSP430s use up to seven different low-power modes. The wake-up times differ on the mode and MSP430 generation. The fastest MSP430-family processors have wake-up times under 1 microsecond.

The MSP430s can run up to 25 MHz, while register-to-register operations take 1 cycle per instruction. The MSP430 family has more than 550 types, not counted package variants. There are microcontrollers with 0.5–512 KB flash or 0.5–256 KB FRAM and up to 66 KB RAM.

The device comes in a variety of generations featuring the usual peripherals:

- Internal oscillator,
- Timer including pulse-width modulation (PWM),
- Watchdog timer,
- USART,
- Serial Peripheral Interface (SPI) bus,
- Inter-Integrated Circuit (I²C),
- Analog-to-digital converter (ADC) options:
  - 10/12/14-bit successive-approximation ADC
  - 16/24-bit delta–sigma ADC
  - internal analog comparator with digital timers
    - Can measure resistor-capacitor slope charging time
- Brownout reset circuitry.

Some less usual peripheral options include on-chip operational amplifiers (op-amp) for signal conditioning, 12-bit digital-to-analog converter (DAC), liquid crystal display (LCD) driver, hardware multiplier, USB, and direct memory access (DMA) for ADC results. Apart from some older erasable programmable read-only memory (EPROM, such as MSP430E3xx) and high volume mask ROM (MSP430Cxxx) versions, all of the devices are in-system programming enabled via Joint Test Action Group (JTAG), full four-wire or Spy-Bi-Wire), a built in bootstrapping loader (BSL) using UART such as RS-232, or USB on devices with USB support. No BSL is included in F20xx, G2xx0, G2xx1, G2xx2, or I20xx family devices.

=== Memory limitations ===
There are, however, limits that preclude its use in more complex embedded systems. The MSP430 does not have an external memory bus, so it is limited to on-chip memory, up to 512 KB flash memory and 66 KB random-access memory (RAM), which may be too small for applications needing large buffers or data tables. Also, although it has a DMA controller, it is very difficult to use it to move data off the chip due to a lack of a DMA output strobe.

== MSP430 CPU ==
Texas Instruments MSP430 registers
^{1}_{5}	^{1}_{4}	^{1}_{3}	^{1}_{2}	^{1}_{1}	^{1}_{0}	^{0}_{9}	^{0}_{8}	^{0}_{7}	^{0}_{6}	^{0}_{5}	^{0}_{4}	^{0}_{3}	^{0}_{2}	^{0}_{1}	^{0}_{0}	(bit position)
PC/R0																Program Counter
SP/R1																Stack Pointer
reserved							V	power				I	N	Z	C	Status Register
CG2/R3																Constant Generator
R4																GP Register 4
R5																GP Register 5
R6																GP Register 6
R7																GP Register 7
R8																GP Register 8
R9																GP Register 9
R10																GP Register 10
R11																GP Register 11
R12																GP Register 12
R13																GP Register 13
R14																GP Register 14
R15																GP Register 15

=== Architecture ===
The MSP430 CPU uses a von Neumann architecture, with a single address space for instructions and data. Memory is byte-addressed, and pairs of bytes are combined little-endian to make 16-bit words.

The processor contains 16 16-bit registers, of which four are dedicated to special purposes: R0 is the program counter, R1 is the stack pointer, R2 is the status register, and R3 is a "constant generator" which reads as zero and ignores writes. Added address mode encodings using R3 and R2 allow a total of six commonly used constant values (0, 1, 2, 4, 8 and −1) without needing an immediate operand word. R4 through R15 are available for general use.

The instruction set is very simple: 27 instructions exist in three categories. Most instructions occur in .B (8-bit byte) and .W (16-bit word) suffixed versions, depending on the value of a B/W bit: the bit is set to 1 for 8-bit and 0 for 16-bit. A missing suffix is equivalent to .W. Byte operations to memory affect only the addressed byte, while byte operations to registers clear the most significant byte.

The 10-bit signed jump offset is stored as a word displacement. The offset is doubled before being added to the PC. 16-bit jumps can be implemented with a MOV or ADD instruction

=== Instruction set ===
MSP430 instruction set
15	14	13	12	11	10	9	8	7	6	5	4	3	2	1	0	Instruction
0	0	0	1	0	0	opcode			B/W	As		register				Single-operand arithmetic
0	0	0	1	0	0	0	0	0	B/W	As		register				RRC Rotate right (1 bit) through carry
0	0	0	1	0	0	0	0	1	0	As		register				SWPB Swap bytes
0	0	0	1	0	0	0	1	0	B/W	As		register				RRA Rotate right (1 bit) arithmetic
0	0	0	1	0	0	0	1	1	0	As		register				SXT Sign extend byte to word
0	0	0	1	0	0	1	0	0	B/W	As		register				PUSH Push value onto stack
0	0	0	1	0	0	1	0	1	0	As		register				CALL Subroutine call; push PC and move source to PC
0	0	0	1	0	0	1	1	0	0	0	0	0	0	0	0	RETI Return from interrupt; pop SR then pop PC
0	0	1	condition			10-bit signed offset										Conditional jump; PC = PC + 2×offset + 2
0	0	1	0	0	0	10-bit signed offset										JNE/JNZ Jump if not equal/zero
0	0	1	0	0	1	10-bit signed offset										JEQ/JZ Jump if equal/zero
0	0	1	0	1	0	10-bit signed offset										JNC/JLO Jump if no carry/lower
0	0	1	0	1	1	10-bit signed offset										JC/JHS Jump if carry/higher or same
0	0	1	1	0	0	10-bit signed offset										JN Jump if negative
0	0	1	1	0	1	10-bit signed offset										JGE Jump if greater or equal
0	0	1	1	1	0	10-bit signed offset										JL Jump if less
0	0	1	1	1	1	10-bit signed offset										JMP Jump (unconditionally)
opcode				source				Ad	B/W	As		destination				Two-operand arithmetic
0	1	0	0	source				Ad	B/W	As		destination				MOV Move source to destination
0	1	0	1	source				Ad	B/W	As		destination				ADD Add source to destination
0	1	1	0	source				Ad	B/W	As		destination				ADDC Add source and carry to destination
0	1	1	1	source				Ad	B/W	As		destination				SUBC Subtract source from destination (with carry)
1	0	0	0	source				Ad	B/W	As		destination				SUB Subtract source from destination
1	0	0	1	source				Ad	B/W	As		destination				CMP Compare (pretend to subtract) source from destination
1	0	1	0	source				Ad	B/W	As		destination				DADD Decimal add source to destination (with carry)
1	0	1	1	source				Ad	B/W	As		destination				BIT Test bits of source AND destination
1	1	0	0	source				Ad	B/W	As		destination				BIC Bit clear (dest &= ~src)
1	1	0	1	source				Ad	B/W	As		destination				BIS Bit set (logical OR)
1	1	1	0	source				Ad	B/W	As		destination				XOR Exclusive or source with destination
1	1	1	1	source				Ad	B/W	As		destination				AND Logical AND source with destination (dest &= src)

Instructions are 16 bits, followed by up to two 16-bit extension words. Addressing modes are specified by the 2-bit source addressing mode (As) and the 1-bit destination addressing mode (Ad) fields. Some special versions can be constructed using R0, and modes other than register direct using R2 (the status register) and R3 (the constant generator) are interpreted specially. As Ad is only 1-bit, it can specify only a subset of the addressing modes for As.

Indexed addressing modes add a 16-bit extension word to the instruction. If both source and destination are indexed, the source extension word comes first. x refers to the next extension word in the instruction stream in the table below.

MSP430 addressing modes
As	Ad	Register	Syntax	Description
00	0	n	Rn	Register direct. The operand is the contents of Rn.
01	1	n	x(Rn)	Indexed. The operand is in memory at address Rn+x.
10	—	n	@Rn	Register indirect. The operand is in memory at the address held in Rn.
11	—	n	@Rn+	Indirect autoincrement. As above, then the register is incremented by 1 or 2.
Addressing modes using R0 (PC)
01	1	0 (PC)	ADDR	Symbolic. Equivalent to x(PC). The operand is in memory at address PC+x.
11	—	0 (PC)	#x	Immediate. Equivalent to @PC+. The operand is the next word in the instruction stream.
Addressing modes using R2 (SR) and R3 (CG), special-case decoding
01	1	2 (SR)	&ADDR	Absolute. The operand is in memory at address x.
10	—	2 (SR)	#4	Constant. The operand is the constant 4.
11	—	2 (SR)	#8	Constant. The operand is the constant 8.
00	—	3 (CG)	#0	Constant. The operand is the constant 0.
01	—	3 (CG)	#1	Constant. The operand is the constant 1. There is no index word.
10	—	3 (CG)	#2	Constant. The operand is the constant 2.
11	—	3 (CG)	#−1	Constant. The operand is the constant −1.

Instructions generally take 1 cycle per word fetched or stored, so instruction times range from 1 cycle for a simple register-register instruction to 6 cycles for an instruction with both source and destination indexed.

The MSP430X extension with 20-bit addressing adds added instructions that can require up to 10 clock cycles. Setting or clearing a peripheral bit takes two clocks. A jump, taken or not takes two clocks. With the 2xx series 2 MCLKs is 125 ns at 16 MHz.

Moves to the program counter are allowed and perform jumps. Return from subroutine, for example, is implemented as MOV @SP+,PC.

When R0 (PC) or R1 (SP) are used with the autoincrement addressing mode, they are always incremented by two. Other registers (R4 through R15) are incremented by the operand size, either 1 or 2 bytes.

The status register contains four arithmetic status bits, a global interrupt enable, and four bits that disable various clocks to enter low-power mode. When handling an interrupt, the processor saves the status register on the stack and clears the low-power bits. If the interrupt handler does not modify the saved status register, returning from the interrupt will then resume the original low-power mode.

=== Pseudo-operations ===
Many added instructions are implemented as aliases for forms of the above. For example, there is no specific "return from subroutine" instruction, but it is implemented as MOV @SP+,PC. Emulated instructions are:

MSP430 Emulated instructions
Emulated	Actual	Description
ADC.x dst	ADDC.x #0,dst	Add carry to destination
BR dst	MOV dst,PC	Branch to destination
CLR.x dst	MOV.x #0,dst	Clear destination
CLRC	BIC #1,SR	Clear carry bit
CLRN	BIC #4,SR	Clear negative bit
CLRZ	BIC #2,SR	Clear zero bit
DADC.x dst	DADD.x #0,dst	Decimal add carry to destination
DEC.x dst	SUB.x #1,dst	Decrement
DECD.x dst	SUB.x #2,dst	Double decrement
DINT	BIC #8,SR	Disable interrupts
EINT	BIS #8,SR	Enable interrupts
INC.x dst	ADD.x #1,dst	Increment
INCD.x dst	ADD.x #2,dst	Double increment
INV.x dst	XOR.x #−1,dst	Invert
NOP	MOV R3,R3	No operation
POP dst	MOV @SP+,dst	Pop from stack
RET	MOV @SP+,PC	Return from subroutine
RLA.x dst	ADD.x dst,dst	Rotate left arithmetic (shift left 1 bit)
RLC.x dst	ADDC.x dst,dst	Rotate left through carry
SBC.x dst	SUBC.x #0,dst	Subtract borrow (1−carry) from destination
SET.x dst	MOV.x #-1,dst	Set destination
SETC	BIS #1,SR	Set carry bit
SETN	BIS #4,SR	Set negative bit
SETZ	BIS #2,SR	Set zero bit
TST.x dst	CMP.x #0,dst	Test destination

Note that the immediate constants −1 (0xffff), 0, 1, 2, 4 and 8 can be specified in a single-word instruction without needing a separate immediate operand.

=== MSP430X 20-bit extension ===
The basic MSP430 cannot support more memory (ROM + RAM + peripherals) than its 64K address space. In order to support this, an extended form of the MSP430 uses 20-bit registers and a 20-bit address space, allowing up to 1 MB of memory. This uses the same instruction set as the basic form, but with two extensions:

1. A limited number of 20-bit instructions for common operations, and
2. A general prefix word mechanism that can extend any instruction to 20 bits.

The extended instructions include some added abilities, notably multibit shifts and multiregister load/store operations.

20-bit operations use the length suffix "A" (for address) instead of .B or .W. .W is still the default. In general, shorter operations clear the high-order bits of the destination register.

The new instructions are as follows:

MSP430X extended instructions
15	14	13	12	11	10	9	8	7	6	5	4	3	2	1	0	Second word	Instruction
0	0	0	0	source				0	0	opcode		destination					Extended memory-register moves
0	0	0	0	src				0	0	0	0	dst				—	MOVA @Rsrc,Rdst
0	0	0	0	src				0	0	0	1	dst				—	MOVA @Rsrc+,Rdst
0	0	0	0	addr[19:16]				0	0	1	0	dst				addr[15:0]	MOVA &abs20,Rdst
0	0	0	0	src				0	0	1	1	dst				x[15:0]	MOVA x(Rsrc),Rdst
0	0	0	0	n−1		op.		0	1	0	W/A	destination					Bit shifts (1–4 bit positions)
0	0	0	0	n−1		0	0	0	1	0	W/A	dst				—	RRCM.x #n,Rdst (Rotate right through carry.)
0	0	0	0	n−1		0	1	0	1	0	W/A	dst				—	RRAM.x #n,Rdst (Rotate right arithmetic, a.k.a. shift right signed.)
0	0	0	0	n−1		1	0	0	1	0	W/A	dst				—	RLAM.x #n,Rdst (Rotate left arithmetic, a.k.a. shift left.)
0	0	0	0	n−1		1	1	0	1	0	W/A	dst				—	RRUM.x #n,Rdst (Rotate right unsigned, a.k.a. shift right logical.)
0	0	0	0	source				0	1	1	op.	destination					Extended register-memory moves
0	0	0	0	src				0	1	1	0	addr[19:16]				addr[15:0]	MOVA Rsrc,&abs20
0	0	0	0	src				0	1	1	1	dst				x[15:0]	MOVA Rsrc,x(Rdst)
0	0	0	0	source				1	opcode			destination					Extended ALU operations
0	0	0	0	imm[19:16]				1	0	0	0	dst				imm[15:0]	MOVA #imm20,Rdst
0	0	0	0	imm[19:16]				1	0	0	1	dst				imm[15:0]	CMPA #imm20,Rdst
0	0	0	0	imm[19:16]				1	0	1	0	dst				imm[15:0]	ADDA #imm20,Rdst
0	0	0	0	imm[19:16]				1	0	1	1	dst				imm[15:0]	SUBA #imm20,Rdst
0	0	0	0	src				1	1	0	0	dst				—	MOVA Rsrc,Rdst
0	0	0	0	src				1	1	0	1	dst				—	CMPA Rsrc,Rdst
0	0	0	0	src				1	1	1	0	dst				—	ADDA Rsrc,Rdst
0	0	0	0	src				1	1	1	1	dst				—	SUBA Rsrc,Rdst
0	0	0	1	0	0	1	1	op.		mode		varies					CALLA
0	0	0	1	0	0	1	1	0	0	0	0	0	0	0	0	—	RETI (Same as MSP430)
0	0	0	1	0	0	1	1	0	1	As		register					CALLA source
0	0	0	1	0	0	1	1	1	0	0	0	abs[19:16]				abs[15:0]	CALLA &abs20
0	0	0	1	0	0	1	1	1	0	0	1	x[19:16]				x[15:0]	CALLA x(PC)
0	0	0	1	0	0	1	1	1	0	1	0	—				—	(reserved)
0	0	0	1	0	0	1	1	1	0	1	1	imm[19:16]				imm[15:0]	CALLA #imm20
0	0	0	1	0	0	1	1	1	1	—						—	(reserved)
0	0	0	1	0	1	dir	W/A	n−1				register					Push/pop n registers ending with specified
0	0	0	1	0	1	0	W/A	n−1				src				—	PUSHM.x #n,Rsrc Push Rsrc, R(src−1), ... R(src−n+1)
0	0	0	1	0	1	1	W/A	n−1				dst−n+1				—	POPM.x #n,Rdst Pop R(dst−n+1), R(dst−n+2), ... Rdst

All other instructions can have an prefix word added which extends them to 20 bits. The prefix word contains an added operand size bit, which is combined with the existing B/W bit to specify the operand size. One unused size combination exists; indications suggest that it may be used in future for a 32-bit operand size.

The prefix word comes in two formats, and the choice between them depends on the instruction which follows. If the instruction has any non-register operands, then the simple form is used, which provides two 4-bit fields to extend any offset or immediate constant in the instruction stream to 20 bits.

If the instruction is register-to-register, a different extension word is used. This includes a "ZC" flag which suppresses carry-in (useful for instructions like DADD which always use the carry bit), and a repeat count. A 4-bit field in the extension word encodes either a repeat count (0–15 repetitions in addition to the initial execution), or a register number which contains a 4-bit repeat count.

MSP430X prefix words
15	14	13	12	11	10	9	8	7	6	5	4	3	2	1	0	Instruction
0	0	0	1	1	—				A/L	0	0	—				Extension word
0	0	0	1	1	src[19:16]				A/L	0	0	dst[19:16]				Memory operand extension
0	0	0	1	1	0	0	ZC	0	A/L	0	0	n−1				Register operand extension (immediate repeat count)
0	0	0	1	1	0	0	ZC	1	A/L	0	0	Rn				Register operand extension (register repeat count)

=== Example code ===
The following assembler source code is for a subroutine named memcpy that copies a block of data words of a given size from one location to another. The data block is copied one word at a time.

 
 
 
 
 
 
 
 
1000
1000  44B5 0000
1004  5325
1006  5336
1008  43FB
100A  4130
100C

; memcpy --
; Copy a block of memory from one location to another.
;
; Entry registers
;       R4 - Address of source data block
;       R5 - Address of target data block
;       R6 - Number of words to copy

            org     1000h        ;Origin at 1000h
memcpy:     mov.w    @r4+,0(r5)  ;Copy word from @r4 to @r5, bump r4
            add.w    #2,r5       ;Bump dest pointer
            add.w    #-1,r6      ;Dec word counter
            jnz      memcpy      ;Jump if r6 ≠ 0
            mov.w    @sp+,pc     ;Return
            end

== MSP430 address space ==
The general layout of the MSP430 address space is:

0x0000–0x0007
Processor special function registers (interrupt control registers)
0x0008–0x00FF
8-bit peripherals. These must be accessed using 8-bit loads and stores.
0x0100–0x01FF
16-bit peripherals. These must be accessed using 16-bit loads and stores.
0x0200–0x09FF
Up to 2048 bytes of RAM.
0x0C00–0x0FFF
1024 bytes of bootstrap loader ROM (flash parts only).
0x1000–0x10FF
256 bytes of data flash ROM (flash parts only).
0x1800-0x19FF
512 bytes of data FRAM (most FRAM MCUs, user-writable containing no calibration data)
0x1100–0x38FF
Extended RAM on models with more than 2048 bytes of RAM. (0x1100–0x18FF is a copy of 0x0200–0x09FF)
0x1100–0xFFFF
Up to 60 kilobytes of program ROM. Smaller ROMs start at higher addresses. The last 16 or 32 bytes are interrupt vectors.

A few models include more than 2048 bytes of RAM; in that case RAM begins at 0x1100. The first 2048 bytes (0x1100–0x18FF) is mirrored at 0x0200–0x09FF for compatibility. Also, some recent models bend the 8-bit and 16-bit peripheral rules, allowing 16-bit access to peripherals in the 8-bit peripheral address range.

There is a new extended version of the architecture (named MSP430X) which allows a 20-bit address space. It allows added program ROM beginning at 0x10000.

The '5xx series has a greatly redesigned address space, with the first 4K devoted to peripherals, and up to 16K of RAM.

== Peripherals ==
The MSP430 peripherals are generally easy to use, with (mostly) consistent addresses between models, and no write-only registers (except for the hardware multiplier).

=== General purpose I/O ports 0–10 ===
If the peripheral is not needed, the pin may be used for general purpose I/O. The pins are divided into 8-bit groups called "ports", each of which is controlled by a number of 8-bit registers. In some cases, the ports are arranged in pairs which can be accessed as 16-bit registers.

The MSP430 family defines 11 I/O ports, P0 through P10, although no chip implements more than 10 of them. P0 is only implemented on the '3xx family. P7 through P10 are only implemented on the largest members (and highest pin count versions) of the '4xx and '2xx families. The newest '5xx and '6xx families has P1 through P11, and the control registers are reassigned to provide more port pairs. Each port is controlled by the following registers. Ports which do not implement particular features (such as interrupt on state change) do not implement the corresponding registers.

PxIN
Port x input. This is a read-only register, and reflects the current state of the port's pins.
PxOUT
Port x output. The values written to this read/write register are driven out the corresponding pins when they are configured to output.
PxDIR
Port x data direction. Bits written as 1 configure the corresponding pin for output. Bits written as 0 configure the pin for input.
PxSEL
Port x function select. Bits written as 1 configure the corresponding pin for use by the specialized peripheral. Bits written as 0 configure the pin for general purpose I/O. Port 0 ('3xx parts only) is not multiplexed with other peripherals and does not have a P0SEL register.
PxREN
Port x resistor enable ('2xx & '5xx only). Bits set in this register enable weak pull-up or pull-down resistors on the corresponding I/O pins even when they are configured as inputs. The direction of the pull is set by the bit written to the PxOUT register.
PxDS
Port x drive strength ('5xx only). Bits set in this register enable high current outputs. This increases output power, but may cause electromagnetic interference (EMI).

Ports 0–2 can produce interrupts when inputs change. Further registers configure this ability:

PxIES
Port x interrupt edge select. Selects the edge which will cause the PxIFG bit to be set. When the input bit changes from matching the PxIES state to not matching it (i.e. whenever a bit in PxIES XOR PxIN changes from clear to set), the corresponding PxIFG bit is set.
PxIE
Port x interrupt enable. When this bit and the corresponding PxIFG bit are both set, an interrupt is generated.
PxIFG
Port x interrupt flag. Set whenever the corresponding pin makes the state change requested by PxIES. Can be cleared only by software. (Can also be set by software.)
PxIV
Port x interrupt vector ('5xx only). This 16-bit register is a priority encoder which can be used to handle pin-change interrupts. If n is the lowest-numbered interrupt bit which is pending in PxIFG and enabled in PxIE, this register reads as 2n+2. If there is no such bit, it reads as 0. The scale factor of 2 allows direct use as an offset into a branch table. Reading this register also clears the reported PxIFG flag.

Some pins have special purposes either as inputs or outputs. (For example, timer pins can be configured as capture inputs or PWM outputs.) In this case, the PxDIR bit controls which of the two functions the pin performs when the PxSEL bit is set. If there is only one special function, then PxDIR is generally ignored. The PxIN register is still readable if the PxSEL bit is set, but interrupt generation is disabled. If PxSEL is clear, the special function's input is frozen and disconnected from the external pin. Also, configuring a pin for general purpose output does not disable interrupt generation.

General purpose I/O register address map

'1xx–'4xx families
		PxIN	PxOUT	PxDIR	PxSEL	PxIES	PxIE	PxIFG	PxREN
P0		0x10	0x11	0x12		0x13	0x14	0x15	
P1		0x20	0x21	0x22	0x26	0x24	0x25	0x23	0x27
P2		0x28	0x29	0x2a	0x2e	0x2c	0x2d	0x2b	0x2f
P3		0x18	0x19	0x1a	0x1b				0x10
P4		0x1c	0x1d	0x1e	0x1f				0x11
P5		0x30	0x31	0x32	0x33				0x12
P6		0x34	0x35	0x36	0x37				0x13
PA	P7	0x38	0x3a	0x3c	0x3e				0x14
PA	P8	0x39	0x3b	0x3d	0x3f				0x15
PB	P9	0x08	0x0a	0x0c	0x0e				0x16
PB	P10	0x09	0x0b	0x0d	0x0f				0x17

'5xx–'6xx & '0xx families
		PxIN	PxOUT	PxDIR	PxREN	PxDS	PxSEL	PxIV	PxIES	PxIE	PxIFG
PA	P1	0x200	0x202	0x204	0x206	0x208	0x20A	0x20E	0x218	0x21A	0x21C
PA	P2	0x201	0x203	0x205	0x207	0x209	0x20B	0x21E	0x219	0x21B	0x21D
PB	P3	0x220	0x222	0x224	0x226	0x228	0x22A				
PB	P4	0x221	0x223	0x225	0x227	0x229	0x22B				
PC	P5	0x240	0x242	0x244	0x246	0x248	0x24A				
PC	P6	0x241	0x243	0x245	0x247	0x249	0x24B				
PD	P7	0x260	0x262	0x264	0x266	0x268	0x26A				
PD	P8	0x261	0x263	0x265	0x267	0x269	0x26B				
PE	P9	0x280	0x282	0x284	0x286	0x288	0x28A				
PE	P10	0x281	0x283	0x285	0x287	0x289	0x28B				
P11		0x2A0	0x2A2	0x2A4	0x2A6	0x2A8	0x2AA				
PJ		0x320	0x322	0x324	0x326	0x328	4 bits only; shared with JTAG pins.				

=== Integrated peripherals ===
Analog
- Analog-to-digital converter

The MSP430 line offers two types of analog-to-digital conversion (ADC). 10- and 12-bit successive approximation converters, as well as a 16-bit sigma–delta converter. Data transfer controllers and a 16-word conversion-and-control buffer allow the MSP430 to convert and store samples without CPU intervention, minimizing power consumption.

- Analog pool

The Analog Pool (A-POOL) module can be configured as an ADC, DAC, comparator, SVS or temperature sensor. It allows flexibility for the user to program a series of analog functions with only one setup.

- Comparator A, A+

The MSP430's comparator module provides precision slope analog-to-digital conversions. Monitors external analog signals and provides voltage and resistor value measurement. Capable of selectable power modes.

- DAC12

The DAC12 module is a 12-bit, voltage-output DAC featuring internal/external reference selection and programmable settling time for optimal power consumption. It can be configured in 8- or 12-bit mode. When multiple DAC12 modules are present, they may be grouped together for synchronous update operation.

- Op Amps

Feature single supply, low current operation with rail-to-rail outputs and programmable settling times. Software selectable configuration options: unity gain mode, comparator mode, inverting PGA, non-inverting PGA, differential and instrumentation amplifier.

- Sigma–Delta (SD)

The SD16/SD16_A/SD24_A modules each feature 16-/24-bit sigma–delta A/D converters with an internal 1.2-V reference. Each converter has up to eight fully differential multiplexed inputs, including a built-in temperature sensor. The converters are second-order oversampling sigma–delta modulators with selectable oversampling ratios of up to 1024 (SD16_A/SD24_A) or 256 (SD16).

Timers

- Basic timer (BT)

The BT has two independent 8-bit timers that can be cascaded to form a 16-bit timer/counter. Both timers can be read and written by software. The BT is extended to provide an integrated RTC. An internal calendar compensates for months with less than 31 days and includes leap-year correction.

- Real-Time Clock

RTC_A/B are 32-bit hardware counter modules that provide clock counters with a calendar, a flexible programmable alarm, and calibration. The RTC_B includes a switchable battery backup system that provides the ability for the RTC to operate when the primary supply fails.

- 16-bit timers

Timer_A, Timer_B and Timer_D are asynchronous 16-bit timers/counters with up to seven capture/compare registers and various operating modes. The timers support multiple capture/compares, PWM outputs, and interval timing. They also have extensive interrupt capabilities. Timer_B introduces added features such as programmable timer lengths (8-, 10-, 12-, or 16-bit) and double-buffered compare register updates, while Timer_D introduces a high-resolution (4 ns) mode.

- Watchdog (WDT+)

The WDT+ performs a controlled system restart after a software problem occurs. If the selected time interval expires, a system reset is generated. If the watchdog function is not needed in an application, the module can be configured as an interval timer and can generate interrupts at selected time intervals.

System

- Advanced Encryption Standard (AES)

The AES accelerator module performs encryption and decryption of 128-bit data with 128-bit keys according to the advanced encryption standard in hardware, and can be configured with user software.

- Brown-Out Reset (BOR)

The BOR circuit detects low supply voltages and resets the device by triggering a power-on reset (POR) signal when power is applied or removed. The MSP430 MCU’s zero-power BOR circuit is continuously turned on, including in all low-power modes.

- Direct Memory Access (DMA) Controller

The DMA controller transfers data from one address to another across the entire address range without CPU intervention. The DMA increases the throughput of peripheral modules and reduces system power consumption. The module features up to three independent transfer channels.

Although the MSP430's DMA subsystem is very capable it has several flaws, the most significant of which is the lack of an external transfer strobe. Although a DMA transfer can be triggered externally, there is no external indication of completion of a transfer. Consequently DMA to and from external sources is limited to external trigger per byte transfers, rather than full blocks automatically via DMA. This can lead to significant complexity (as in requiring extensive hand tweaking of code) when implementing processor to processor or processor to USB communications. The reference cited uses an obscure timer mode to generate high speed strobes for DMA transfers. The timers are not flexible enough to easily make up for the lack of an external DMA transfer strobe.

DMA operations that involve word transfers to byte locations cause truncation to 8 bits rather than conversion to two byte transfers. This makes DMA with A/D or D/A 16 bit values less useful than it could be (although it is possible to DMA these values through port A or B on some versions of the MSP 430 using an externally visible trigger per transfer such as a timer output).

- Enhanced Emulation Module (EEM)

The EEM provides different levels of debug features such as 2-8 hardware breakpoints, complex breakpoints, break when read/write occurs at specified address, and more. Embedded into all flash-based MSP430 devices.

- Hardware multiplier

Some MSP430 models include a memory-mapped hardware multiplier peripheral which performs various 16×16+32→33-bit multiply-accumulate operations. Unusually for the MSP430, this peripheral does include an implicit 2-bit write-only register, which makes it effectively impossible to context switch. This peripheral does not interfere with CPU activities and can be accessed by the DMA. The MPY on all MSP430F5xx and some MSP430F4xx devices feature up to 32-bit x 32-bit.

The 8 registers used are:

Address	Name	Function
0x130	MPY	Operand1 for unsigned multiply
0x132	MPYS	Operand1 for signed multiply
0x134	MAC	Operand1 for unsigned multiply-accumulate
0x136	MACS	Operand1 for signed multiply-accumulate
0x138	OP2	Second operand for multiply operation
0x13A	ResLo	Low word of multiply result
0x13C	ResHi	High word of multiply result
0x13E	SumExt	Carry out of multiply-accumulate

The first operand is written to one of four 16-bit registers. The address written determines the operation performed. While the value written can be read back from any of the registers, the register number written to cannot be recovered.

If a multiply-accumulate operation is desired, the ResLo and ResHi registers must also be initialized.

Then, each time a write is performed to the OP2 register, a multiply is performed and the result stored or added to the result registers. The SumExt register is a read-only register that contains the carry out of the addition (0 or 1) in case of an unsigned multiply), or the sign extension of the 32-bit sum (0 or -1) in case of a signed multiply. In the case of a signed multiply-accumulate, the SumExt value must be combined with the most significant bit of the prior SumHi contents to determine the true carry out result (-1, 0, or +1).

The result is available after three clock cycles of delay, which is the time required to fetch a following instruction and a following index word. Thus, the delay is typically invisible. An explicit delay is only required if using an indirect addressing mode to fetch the result.

- Memory Protection Unit (MPU)

The FRAM MPU protects against accidental writes to designated read-only memory segments or execution of code from a constant memory. The MPU can set any portioning of memory with bit level addressing, making the complete memory accessible for read, write and execute operations in FRAM devices.

- Power management module (PMM)

The power management module generates a supply voltage for the core logic, and provides several mechanisms for the supervision and monitoring of both the voltage applied to the device and the voltage generated for the core. It is integrated with a low-dropout voltage regulator (LDO), brown-out reset (BOR), and a supply voltage supervisor and monitor.

- Supply-Voltage Supervisor (SVS)

The SVS is a configurable module used to monitor the AVCC supply voltage or an external voltage. The SVS can be configured to set a flag or generate a power-on reset (POR) when the supply voltage or external voltage drops below a user-selected threshold.

Communication and Interface

- Capacitive Touch Sense I/Os

The integrated capacitive touch sense I/O module offers several benefits to touch button and touch slider applications. The system does not require external components to create the self-oscillation (reducing bill of materials) and the capacitor (that defines the frequency of the self-oscillation) can be connected directly. In addition, there is no need for external MUXes to allow multiple pads and each I/O pad can directly serve as a cap sense input. A hysteresis of ~0.7 V ensures robust operation. Control and sequencing is done completely in software.

- General Purpose I/Os

MSP430 devices have up to 12 digital I/O ports implemented. Each port has eight I/O pins. Every I/O pin can be configured as either input or output, and can be individually read or written to. Ports P1 and P2 have interrupt capability. MSP430F2xx, F5xx and some F4xx devices feature built-in, individually configurable pull-up or pull-down resistors.

- Sub-GHz RF Front End

The flexible CC1101 sub-1 GHz transceiver delivers the sensitivity and blocking performance required to achieve successful communication links in any RF environment. It also features low current consumption and supports flexible data rates and modulation formats.

- USART (UART, SPI, I²C)

The universal synchronous/asynchronous receive/transmit (USART) peripheral interface supports asynchronous RS-232 and synchronous SPI communication with one hardware module. The MSP430F15x/16x USART modules also support I²C, programmable baud rate, and independent interrupt capability for receive and transmit.

- USB

The USB module is fully compliant with the USB 2.0 specification and supports control, interrupt and bulk transfers at a data rate of 12 Mbps (full speed). The module supports USB suspend, resume and remote wake-up operations and can be configured for up to eight input and eight output endpoints. The module includes an integrated physical interface (PHY); a phase-locked loop (PLL) for USB clock generation; and a flexible power-supply system enabling bus-powered and self-powered devices.

- USCI (UART, SPI, I²C, LIN, IrDA)

The universal serial communication interface (USCI) module features two independent channels that can be used simultaneously. The asynchronous channel (USCI_A) supports UART mode; SPI mode; pulse shaping for IrDA; and automatic baud-rate detection for LIN communications. The synchronous channel (USCI_B) supports I²C and SPI modes.

- USI (SPI, I²C)

The universal serial interface (USI) module is a synchronous serial communication interface with a data length of up to 16-bits and can support SPI and I²C communication with minimal software.

- Infrared Modulation

Available on the MSP430FR4xxx and MSP430FR2xxx series chips, this feature is configured via the SYSCFG register set. This peripheral ties into other peripherals (Timers, eUSCI_A) to generate an IR modulated signal on an output pin.

Metering

- ESP430 (integrated in FE42xx devices)

The ESP430CE module performs metering calculations independent of the CPU. Module has separate SD16, HW multiplier, and the ESP430 embedded processor engine for single-phase energy-metering applications.

- Scan Interface (SIF)

The SIF module, a programmable state machine with an analog front end, is used to automatically measure linear or rotational motion with the lowest possible power consumption. The module features support for different types of LC and resistive sensors and for quadrature encoding.

Display

- LCD/LCD_A/LCD_B

The LCD/LCD_A controller directly drives LCDs for up to 196 segments. Supports static, 2-mux, 3-mux, and 4-mux LCDs. LCD_A module has integrated charge pump for contrast control. LCD_B enables blinking of individual segments with separate blinking memory.

- LCD_E

The LCD_E controller comes with the newer MSP430FR4xxx series microcontrollers and directly drives LCDs up to 448 segments. Supports static, 2-mux, 3-mux, 4-mux, 5-mux, 6-mux, 7-mux, 8-mux (1/3 bias) LCDs. Segment and Common pins may be reprogrammed to available LCD drive pins. This peripheral may be driven in LPM3.5 (RTC running+Main CPU core shutdown low-power mode).

== Software development environment ==
Texas Instruments provides various hardware experimenter boards that support large (approximately two centimeters square) and small (approximately one millimeter square) MSP430 chips. TI also provides software development tools, both directly, and in conjunction with partners (see the full list of compilers, assemblers, and IDEs). One such toolchain is the IAR C/C++ compiler and Integrated development environment, or IDE. A Kickstart edition can be downloaded for free from TI or IAR; it is limited to 8 KB of C/C++ code in the compiler and debugger (assembly language programs of any size can be developed and debugged with this free toolchain).

TI also combines a version of its own compiler and tools with its Eclipse-based Code Composer Studio IDE (CCS). It sells full-featured versions, and offers a free version for download which has a code size limit of 16 KB. CCS supports in-circuit emulators, and includes a simulator and other tools; it can also work with other processors sold by TI.

For those who are more comfortable with the Arduino, there is also another software Energia, an open source electronics prototyping platform with the goal to bring the Wiring and Arduino framework to the Texas Instruments MSP430 based LaunchPad where Arduino code can be exported for programming MSP430 chips. The latest release of Energia supports the MSP-EXP430G2xxx, MSP-EXP430FR5739, MSP-EXP430FR5969, MSP-EXP430FR5994, MSP-EXP430F5529LP, Stellaris EK-LM4F120XL, Tiva-C EK-TM4C123GXL, Tiva-C EK-TM4C1294XL, CC3200 Wi-Fi LaunchPad.

The open source community produces a freely available software development toolset based on the GNU toolset. The GNU compiler is currently declined in three versions:

(MSPGCC)

(MSPGCC Uniarch)

TI consulted with RedHat to provide official support for the MSP430 architecture to the GNU Compiler Collection C/C++ compiler. This msp430-elf-gcc compiler is supported by TI's Code Composer Studio version 6.0 and higher.

There is a very early llvm-msp430 project, which may eventually provide better support for MSP430 in LLVM.

Other commercial development tool sets, which include editor, compiler, linker, assembler, debugger and in some cases code wizards, are available. VisSim, a block diagram language for model based development, generates efficient fixed point C-Code directly from the diagram. VisSim generated code for a closed loop ADC+PWM based PID control on the F2013 compiles to less than 1 KB flash and 100 bytes RAM. VisSim has on-chip peripheral blocks for the entire MSP430 family I²C, ADC, SD16, PWM.

== Development platforms ==
The MSP430F2013 and its siblings are set apart by the fact that (except for the MSP430G2 Value Line) it is the only MSP430 part that is available in a dual in-line package (DIP). Other variants in this family are only available in various surface-mount packages. TI has gone to some trouble to support the eZ430 development platform by making the raw chips easy for hobbyists to use in prototypes.

=== eZ430-F2013 ===
TI has tackled the low-budget problem by offering a very small experimenter board, the eZ430-F2013, on a USB stick (now obsolete). This made it easy for designers to choose the MSP430 chip for inexpensive development platforms that can be used with a computer. The eZ430-F2013 contains an MSP430F2013 microcontroller on a detachable prototyping board, and accompanying CD with development software.

=== MSP430 LaunchPad ===
Texas Instruments released the MSP430 LaunchPad in July 2010 at a cost of $4.30. The MSP430 LaunchPad has an onboard flash emulator, USB, 2 programmable LEDs, and 1 programmable push button. As an addition to experimentation with the LaunchPad a shield board is available.

TI has since provided several new LaunchPads based on the MSP430 platform:

- MSP-EXP430F5529LP features the MSP430F5529 USB device-capable MCU with 128 KB flash and 8 KB SRAM
- MSP-EXP430FR5969 features the MSP430FR5969 FRAM MCU with 64 KB FRAM and 2 KB SRAM
- MSP-EXP430FR4133 features the MSP430FR4133 FRAM MCU with 16 KB FRAM, 2 KB SRAM and on-board LCD
- MSP-EXP430FR6989 features the MSP430FR6989 FRAM MCU with 128 KB FRAM, 2 KB SRAM, on-board LCD and Extended Scan Interface peripheral
- MSP-EXP430FR2311 features the MSP430FR2311 FRAM MCU with 4 KB FRAM, 1 KB SRAM, OpAmp and Transimpedance Amplifier peripheral
- MSP-EXP430FR2433 features the MSP430FR2433 FRAM MCU with 15.5 KB FRAM, 4 KB SRAM
- MSP-EXP430FR2355 features the MSP430FR2355 FRAM MCU with 32 KB FRAM, 4 KB SRAM, 12-bit ADC, 12-bit DAC, OpAmp/PGA, ICC for nested interrupts
- MSP-EXP430FR5994 features the MSP430FR5994 FRAM MCU with 256 KB FRAM, 8 KB SRAM, 12-bit ADC and LEA DSP peripheral

All three of these LaunchPads include an eZ-FET JTAG debugger with backchannel UART capable of 1 Mbit/s speeds. The FRAM LaunchPads (e.g. MSP-EXP430FR5969, MSP-EXP430FR4133) include EnergyTrace, a feature supported by TI's Code Composer Studio IDE for monitoring and analyzing power consumption.

== Debugging interface ==
In common with other microcontroller vendors, TI has developed a two-wire debugging interface found on some of their MSP430 parts that can replace the larger JTAG interface. The eZ430 Development Tool contains a full USB-connected flash emulation tool (FET) for this new two-wire protocol, named Spy-Bi-Wire by TI. Spy-Bi-Wire was initially introduced on only the smallest devices in the 'F2xx family with limited number of I/O pins, such as the MSP430F20xx, MSP430F21x2, and MSP430F22x2. The support for Spy-Bi-Wire has been expanded with the introduction of the latest '5xx family, where all devices have support Spy-Bi-Wire interface in addition to JTAG.

The advantage of the Spy-Bi-Wire protocol is that it uses only two communication lines, one of which is the dedicated _RESET line. The JTAG interface on the lower pin count MSP430 parts is multiplexed with general purpose I/O lines. This makes it relatively difficult to debug circuits built around the small, low-I/O-budget chips, since the full 4-pin JTAG hardware will conflict with anything else connected to those I/O lines. This problem is alleviated with the Spy-Bi-Wire-capable chips, which are still compatible with the normal JTAG interface for backwards compatibility with the old development tools.

JTAG debugging and flash programming tools based on OpenOCD and widely used in the ARM architecture community are not available for the MSP430. Programming tools specially designed for the MSP430 are marginally less expensive than JTAG interfaces that use OpenOCD. However, should it be discovered mid-project that more MIPS, more memory, and more I/O peripherals are needed, those tools will not transfer to a processor from another vendor.

== MSP430 generations ==
Six general generations of MSP430 processors exist. In order of development, they are: '3xx generation, '1xx generation, '4xx generation, '2xx generation, '5xx generation, and '6xx generation. The digit after the generation identifies the model (generally higher model numbers are larger and more capable), the third digit identifies the amount of memory included, and the fourth, if present, identifies a minor model variant. The most common variation is a different on-chip analog-to-digital converter.

The 3xx and 1xx generations are limited to a 16-bit address space. In the later generations this was expanded to include '430X' instructions that allow a 20-bit address space. As happened with other processor architectures (e.g. the processor of the PDP-11), extending the addressing range beyond the 16-bit word size introduced some peculiarities and inefficiencies for programs larger than 64 KB.

In the following list, it helps to think of the typical 200 mA·Hr capacity of a CR2032 lithium coin cell as 200,000 μA·Hr, or 22.8 μA·year. Thus, considering only the CPU draw, such a battery could supply a 0.7 μA current draw for 32 years. (In reality, battery self-discharge would reduce this number.)

The significance of the RAM retention vs the real-time clock mode is that in real time clock mode the CPU can go to sleep with a clock running which will wake it up at a specified future time. In RAM retention mode, some external signal is required to wake it, e.g., input/output (I/O) pin signal or SPI slave receive interrupt.

=== MSP430x1xx series ===
The MSP430x1xx Series is the first generation with flash memory. They are generally more capable than the '3xx generation, but without an embedded LCD controller. These flash- or ROM-based ultra-low-power MCUs offer 8 MIPS, 1.8–3.6 V operation, up to 60 KB flash, and a wide range of analog and digital peripherals.

- Power specification overview, as low as:
  - 0.1 μA RAM retention
  - 0.7 μA real-time clock mode
  - 200 μA / MIPS active
  - Features fast wake-up from standby mode in less than 6 μs.

- Device parameters
  - Flash options: 1–60 KB
  - ROM options: 1–16 KB
  - RAM: 128 B–10 KB
  - GPIO options: 14, 22, 48 pins
  - ADC options: Slope, 10 & 12-bit SAR
  - Other integrated peripherals: 12-bit DAC, up to 2 16-bit timers, watchdog timer, brown-out reset, SVS, USART module (UART, SPI), DMA, 16×16 multiplier, Comparator_A, temperature sensor

=== MSP430F2xx series ===
The MSP430F2xx Series are similar to the '1xx generation, but operate at even lower power, support up to 16 MHz operation, and have a more accurate (±2%) on-chip clock that makes it easier to operate without an external crystal. These flash-based ultra-low power devices offer 1.8–3.6 V operations. It includes the very-low power oscillator (VLO), internal pull-up/pull-down resistors, and low-pin count options.

- Power specification overview, as low as:
  - 0.1 μA RAM retention
  - 0.3 μA standby mode (VLO)
  - 0.7 μA real-time clock mode
  - 220 μA / MIPS active
  - Feature ultra-fast wake-up from standby mode in less than 1 μs

- Device parameters
  - Flash options: 1–120 KB
  - RAM options: 128 B – 8 KB
  - GPIO options: 10, 11, 16, 24, 32, and 48 pins
  - ADC options: Slope, 10 & 12-bit SAR, 16 & 24-bit Sigma Delta
  - Other integrated peripherals: operational amplifiers, 12-bit DAC, up to 2 16-bit timers, watchdog timer, brown-out reset, SVS, USI module (I²C, SPI), USCI module, DMA, 16×16 multiplier, Comparator_A+, temperature sensor

=== MSP430G2xx series ===
The MSP430G2xx Value Series features flash-based Ultra-Low Power MCUs up to 16 MIPS with 1.8–3.6 V operation. It includes the Very-Low power Oscillator (VLO), internal pull-up/pull-down resistors, and low-pin count options at lower prices than the MSP430F2xx series.

- Ultra-Low Power, as low as (@2.2 V):
  - 0.1 μA RAM retention
  - 0.4 μA Standby mode (VLO)
  - 0.7 μA real-time clock mode
  - 220 μA / MIPS active
  - Ultra-Fast Wake-Up From Standby Mode in <1 μs

- Device parameters
  - Flash options: 0.5–56 KB
  - RAM options: 128 B–4 KB
  - GPIO options: 10, 16, 24, 32 pins
  - ADC options: Slope, 10-bit SAR
  - Other integrated peripherals: Capacitive Touch I/O, up to 3 16-bit timers, watchdog timer, brown-out reset, USI module (I²C, SPI), USCI module, Comparator_A+, Temp sensor

=== MSP430x3xx series ===
The MSP430x3xx Series is the oldest generation, released between 1995 and 1998. The MSP430 was designed as a successor to TSS400 for battery-powered metering instruments. All MSP430x3xx had an embedded LCD controller and also a digital controlled oscillator (DCO) with frequency-locked loop (FLL) which provided a stable system clock (1 to 4 MHz) using a low-frequency crystal (32 kHz). This generation does not support EEPROM memory, only mask ROM and UV-eraseable and one-time programmable EPROM. Later generations provide only flash memory and mask ROM options. These devices offer 2.5–5.5 V operation, up to 32 KB ROM.

- Power specification overview, as low as:
  - 0.1 μA RAM retention
  - 0.9 μA real-time clock mode
  - 160 μA / MIPS active
  - Features fast wake-up from standby mode in less than 6 μs.

- Device parameters:
  - ROM options: 2–32 KB
  - RAM options: 512 B–1 KB
  - GPIO options: 14, 40 pins
  - ADC options: Slope, 14-bit SAR
  - Other integrated peripherals: LCD controller, multiplier

=== MSP430x4xx series ===
The MSP430x4xx Series are similar to the '1xx generation, but include an integrated LCD controller, and are larger and often more capable. These flash or ROM based devices offers 8–16 MIPS at 1.8–3.6 V operation, with FLL, and SVS. Ideal for low power metering and medical applications.

- Power specification overview, as low as:
  - 0.1 μA RAM retention
  - 0.7 μA real-time clock mode
  - 200 μA / MIPS active
  - Features fast wake-up from standby mode in less than 6 μs.

- Device parameters:
  - Flash/ROM options: 4 – 120 KB
  - RAM options: 256 B – 8 KB
  - GPIO options: 14, 32, 48, 56, 68, 72, 80 pins
  - ADC options: Slope, 10 & 12-bit SAR, 16-bit Sigma Delta
  - Other integrated peripherals: SCAN_IF, ESP430, 12-bit DAC, Op Amps, RTC, up to 2 16-bit timers, watchdog timer, basic timer, brown-out reset, SVS, USART module (UART, SPI), USCI module, LCD Controller, DMA, 16×16 & 32x32 multiplier, Comparator_A, temperature sensor, 8 MIPS CPU Speed

=== MSP430x5xx series ===
The MSP430x5xx Series are able to run up to 25 MHz, have up to 512 KB flash memory and up to 66 KB RAM. This flash-based family features low active power consumption with up to 25 MIPS at 1.8–3.6 V operation (165 uA/MIPS). Includes an innovative power management module for optimal power consumption and integrated USB.

- Power specification overview, as low as:
  - 0.1 μA RAM retention
  - 2.5 μA real-time clock mode
  - 165 μA / MIPS active
  - Features fast wake-up from standby mode in less than 5 μs.

- Device parameters:
  - Flash options: up to 512 KB
  - RAM options: up to 66 KB
  - ADC options: 10 & 12-bit SAR
  - GPIO options: 29, 31, 47, 48, 63, 67, 74, 87 pins
  - Other optional integrated peripherals: 12-bit DAC, High resolution PWM, 5 V I/O's, USB, backup battery switch, up to 4 16-bit timers, watchdog timer, Real-Time Clock, brown-out reset, SVS, USCI module, DMA, 32x32 multiplier, Comp B, temperature sensor

=== MSP430x6xx series ===
The MSP430x6xx Series are able to run up to 25 MHz, have up to 512 KB flash memory and up to 66 KB RAM. This flash-based family features low active power consumption with up to 25 MIPS at 1.8–3.6 V operation (165 uA/MIPS). Includes an innovative power management module for optimal power consumption and integrated USB. Many 6xx series devices are pin-compatible with an analogous 5xx series device except that the 6xx device adds USB support.

- Power specification overview, as low as:
  - 0.1 μA RAM retention
  - 2.5 μA real-time clock mode
  - 165 μA / MIPS active
  - Features fast wake-up from standby mode in less than 5 μs.

- Device parameters:
  - Flash options: up to 512 KB
  - RAM options: up to 66 KB
  - ADC options: 12-bit SAR
  - GPIO options: 74 pins
  - Other integrated peripherals: USB, LCD, DAC, Comparator_B, DMA, 32x32 multiplier, power management module (BOR, SVS, SVM, LDO), watchdog timer, RTC, Temp sensor

=== RF SoC (CC430) series ===
The RF SoC (CC430) Series provides tight integration between the microcontroller core, peripherals, software, and RF transceiver. Features <1 GHz RF transceiver, with 1.8 V–3.6 V operation. Programming using Arduino integrated development environment (IDE) is possible via the panStamp API.

- Power specification overview, as low as:
  - 1 μA RAM retention
  - 1.7 μA real-time clock mode
  - 180 μA / MIPS active

- Device parameters:
  - Speed options: up to 20 MHz
  - Flash options: up to 32 KB
  - RAM options: up to 4 KB
  - ADC options: 12-bit SAR
  - GPIO options: 30 & 44 pins
  - Other integrated peripherals: LCD Controller, up to 2 16-bit timers, watchdog timer, RTC, power management module (BOR, SVS, SVM, LDO), USCI module, DMA, 32x32 multiplier, Comp B, temperature sensor

=== FRAM series ===
The FRAM Series from Texas Instruments provides unified memory with dynamic partitioning and memory write speeds 100 times faster than flash. FRAM is also capable of zero power state retention in all power modes, which means that writes are guaranteed, even in the event of a power loss. With a write endurance of over 100 trillion cycles, EEPROM is no longer required. Active power consumption at less than 100 μA/MHz.

- Power specification overview, as low as:
  - 320 nA RAM retention
  - 0.35 μA real-time clock mode
  - 82 μA / MIPS active

- Device parameters:
  - Speed options: 8 to 24 MHz
  - FRAM options: 4 to 256 KB
  - RAM options: 0.5 to 8 KB
  - ADC options: 10 or 12-bit SAR
  - GPIO options: 17 to 83 GPIO pins
  - Other possible integrated peripherals: MPU, up to 6 16-bit timers, watchdog timer, RTC, power management module (BOR, SVS, SVM, LDO), USCI module, DMA, multiplier, Comp B, temperature sensor, LCD driver, I2C and UART BSL, Extended Scan Interface, 32 bit multiplier, AES, CRC, signal processing acceleration, capacitive touch, IR modulation

=== Low voltage series ===
The Low Voltage Series include the MSP430C09x and MSP430L092 parts, capable of running at 0.9 V. These 2 series of low voltage 16-bit microcontrollers have configurations with two 16-bit timers, an 8-bit analog-to-digital (A/D) converter, an 8-bit digital-to-analog (D/A) converter, and up to 11 I/O pins.

- Power specification overview, as low as:
  - 1 μA RAM retention
  - 1.7 μA real-time clock mode
  - 180 μA / MIPS active

- Device parameters:
  - Speed options: 4 MHz
  - ROM options: 1–2 KB
  - SRAM options: 2 KB
  - ADC options: 8-bit SAR
  - GPIO options: 11 pins
  - Other integrated peripherals: up to 2 16-bit timers, watchdog timer, brown-out reset, SVS, comparator, temperature sensor

=== Other MSP430 families ===
More families within MSP430 include Fixed Function, Automotive, and Extended Temp parts.

Fixed Function: The MSP430BQ1010 16-bit microcontroller is an advanced fixed-function device that forms the control and communications unit on the receiver side for wireless power transfer in portable applications. MSP430BQ1010 complies with the Wireless Power Consortium (WPC) specification. For more information, see Contactless Power.

Automotive: Automotive MSP430 microcontrollers (MCUs) from Texas Instruments (TI) are 16-bit, RISC-based, mixed-signal processors that are AEC-Q100 qualified and suitable for automotive applications in environments up to 105 °C ambient temperature. LIN compliant drivers for the MSP430 MCU provided by IHR GmbH.

Extended Temp: MSP430 devices are very popular in harsh environments such as industrial sensing for their low power consumption and innovative analog integration. Some harsh environment applications include transportation/automotive, renewable energy, military/space/avionics, mineral exploration, industrial, and safety & security.

- Device Definitions:
  - HT: -55 °C to 150 °C
  - EP: Enhanced products -55 °C to 125 °C
  - Q1: Automotive Q100 qualified -40 °C to 105 °C
  - T: Extended temperature -40 °C to 105 °C applications

Note that when the flash size is over 64K words (128 KBytes), instruction addresses can no longer be encoded in just two bytes. This change in pointer size causes some incompatibilities with previous parts.

Name	Manufacturer	Interface	Protocol(s)	Status
MSP-FET430PIF	TI	Parallel-Port	JTAG	
MSP-FET430UIF	TI	USB-Interface	JTAG, Spy-Bi-Wire	
MSP-FET	TI	USB-Interface	JTAG, Spy-Bi-Wire	
MSP-430 LaunchPad	TI	USB-Interface	Spy-Bi-Wire	
MSP-430 LaunchPad eZ-FET	TI	USB-Interface	Spy-Bi-Wire	
eZ430-F2013	TI	USB-Interface	Spy-Bi-Wire	obsolete
eZ430-RF2500	TI	USB-Interface	Spy-Bi-Wire	
FETP	SoftBaugh	Parallel-Port	JTAG	
USBP	SoftBaugh	USB-Interface	JTAG, Spy-Bi-Wire	discontinued
MSP430-JTAG	Olimex	Parallel-Port	JTAG	
MSP430-JTAG-ISO	Olimex	USB-Interface	JTAG, Spy-Bi-Wire	obsolete
MSP430-JTAG-ISO-MK2	Olimex	USB-Interface	JTAG, Spy-Bi-Wire	
MSP430-JTAG-Tiny	Olimex	USB-Interface	JTAG, Spy-Bi-Wire	not found
MSP430-JTAG-TINY-V2	Olimex	USB-Interface	JTAG?, Spy-Bi-Wire	
MSP430-JTAG-RF	Olimex	USB-Interface	JTAG, Spy-Bi-Wire	
FlashPro-CC	Elprotronic	USB-Interface	JTAG, Spy-Bi-Wire, BSL	
VisSim/ECD	Visual Solutions	USB-Interface	JTAG, Spy-Bi-Wire	
LA-3713	Lauterbach	USB-Interface / Ethernet	JTAG, Spy-bi-Wire	
