= BTRON =

Business TRON
- Working state: Active
- Initial release: 1984
- Marketing target: Personal computers, workstations, PDAs
- Supported platforms: Intel 80286
- Default user interface: Graphical user interface

BTRON (Business TRON) is one of the subprojects of the TRON Project proposed by Ken Sakamura, which is responsible for the business phase. It refers to the operating systems (OS), keyboards, peripheral interface specifications, and other items related to personal computers (PCs) that were developed there.

Originally, it refers to specifications rather than specific products, but in reality, the term "BTRON" is often used to refer to implementations. Currently, Personal Media Corporation's B-right/V is an implementation of BTRON3, and a software product called "Cho-Kanji" that includes it has been released.

== Specifications ==
As with other TRON systems, only the specification of BTRON has been formulated, and the implementation method is not specified. Implementation is mentioned in this section to the extent necessary to explain the specification, but please refer to the Implementation section for details.

=== BTRON1, BTRON2, BTRON3 ===
The BTRON project began with Matsushita Electric Industrial and Personal Media prototyping "BTRON286," an implementation on a 16-bit CPU 286 for the CEC machine described below. BTRON1 specifications include the BTRON1 Programming Standard Handbook, which describes the OS API, and the BTRON1 Specification Software Specification. which describes the OS API.

BTRON2 is planned to be implemented on TRONCHIP, and only the specification has been created and published. It is planned to be implemented on evaluation machines equipped with TRON chips made by Fujitsu and named "2B". One of its features is that all OS-managed computing resources such as memory, processes, and threads are handled in a real/pseudomorphic model, a feature of BTRON.

SIGBTRON's TRON chip machine MCUBE implemented "3B," which is 32-bit and uses an ITRON-specification RTOS (modified from "ItIs") for the microkernel. 3B and The B-right specification used in Cho-Kanji, etc. is "BTRON3" (currently, the microkernel is I-right); the specification that B-right/V conforms to is published as the BTRON3 specification.

=== μBTRON ===
This is a BTRON subset that was envisioned as a popular version. With the performance of computer hardware at the time of its conception, a computer that can implement the ideal BTRON would be a workstation-class computer, so it is also positioned as BTRON for general households.

BTRON is a subset of a dedicated machine with fixed applications (like a dedicated machine word processor), and is based on the concept of a "dedicated communication machine. Specific applications include "communication with oneself (creative activities)", "communication with others (Internet communication)", and "communication with machines" (e.g. data exchange with peripheral devices, such as digital cameras).

Linkage with the last peripheral device was envisioned as the key to adding functions to a dedicated machine to which no additional programs could be added. This peripheral device was called "electronic stationery". For communication with these peripherals, a prototype of the real-time "μBTRON bus" (see below) was developed. Note that BrainPad TiPO, a BTRON-equipped PDA realized later, was given the name "electronic stationery" and also called μBTRON, but it was not subsumed to become a dedicated machine and did not implement the μBTRON bus.

=== Hardware ===
==== TRON keyboard ====
Although it does not bear the BTRON moniker, the TRON keyboard is intended for use with BTRON.

==== μBTRON bus ====
The basic specification is based on IEEE 802.5 with modifications. A real-time bus specification for LANs that can be considered as an alternative to MIDI.

Other references in this section: Tanaka, K.; Shimizu, Y.; Tamai, K.; Tsunoda, S.; Kato, H. (1992). Performance evaluation of Proceedings. 1992. Ninth. pp. 40–45. doi:10.1109/TRON.1992.313270. S2CID 109551151.

== Features ==
=== TAD ===
For data handled by BTRON, a basic format for exchange called TAD (Tron Application Databus) has been defined, and basic data can be freely exchanged between arbitrary applications, advocating Databus. Standards have been established for text (including word-processing modifications) and graphics (both raster and vector), and for the rest, a header indicating the length of the chunks is common at the beginning, so that applications can skip over unsupported data if they find it. Data chunks are referred to as segments in the BTRON specification, etc.

In addition, since the TRON chip was big-endian, TAD was also designed in big-endian, but when BTRON286 was implemented, a quasi-TAD that was modified to little-endian was defined, and the current widely used implementations are all in that format, including the one on MCUBE that uses the TRON chip.

Image (raster) data is defined in the direction of adapting to any hardware scheme, including palette and direct specification, packed pixels and planes, and so on. Both are solid, uncompressed. For compression, only the MH (facsimile#1D encoding (MH)) method for black and white images was defined. There are working implementations of moving images, but there is no description of any time axis within the published TAD specification. In actual applications, there are some that store their own data as TAD segments according to TAD policy, but there are also some that read and write records directly instead of using TAD.

=== Real body/pseudo body ===
BTRON adopts a network-type model with an arbitrary directed graph structure called a real/pseudomorphic model as a file management model, instead of the conventional tree structure model with directories (folders). BTRON2 also manages all computer resources in a real/pseudo model. As for the functions provided to users, the real/pseudomodel of BTRON (BTRON1 and BTRON3, which are widely used implementations) is a convenient hypertext environment.

In the past, files and folders were used to distinguish between entities that contain data and indexes that point to them, but BTRON has done away with such distinction. In the body/pseudo-body model, the entire body of data is defined as a Real Object, and the part of the Real Object that points to another Real Object is defined as a Virtual Object.

A real body is like a file in the sense that it holds data, but it is also like a folder in the sense that it has the ability to point to another real body by the temporary body it contains as its contents.

While almost all current UNIX do not allow the creation of alias hard links that point to directories, BTRON's real/pseudo links are like hard links that can freely create arbitrary links including such links. In Unix, a link to the parent indicated by "..." is used. In Unix, the fact that there is only one link to the parent indicated by "..." is a problem, but this is not a problem in BTRON because it has abandoned tree-like management in the first place.

Confirmation that the real body is no longer referenced by deleting a link is done by the reference count method, as in the Unix file system, but since arbitrary structures are allowed, as is well known as a weakness of the reference-counting method, loops can cause the file system to occupy disk space even though it cannot be reached from anywhere. Currently, a function is implemented to check for such entities by disconnecting the file system or (in the case of system disks) booting the system in a special state and performing a check similar to fsck as well as the so-called stop-the-world method of garbage collection. In addition, most of the previous versions of the software

Also, unlike most previous file systems, the name ("real name") is basically not used for identification (as an ID) on the system side, so the user can give a name freely (currently there is a length limit for implementation reasons).

Currently, BTMemo for Windows is available as software that reproduces the feeling of using BTRON.

The existing implementations of BTRON3 and BTRON1 realize the above functions on a file system with multi-record functions: one file corresponds to one entity, has a record containing the data body, and also has a "link record" that points to a file corresponding to the entity to which the temporary body contained by the entity points. In addition, there is a "link record" that points to the file corresponding to the real body to which the temporary body that the real body contains points. Because of this design, the real body data by TAD itself is not affected by the way links are represented in the underlying system.

==== Problems ====
One of the problems currently occurring is that only a maximum of 64Ki files can be placed on a single volume (such as a hard disk partition) due to the implementation of the file system inherited from BTRON286, and the number of real bodies is limited accordingly. It has been pointed out that the number of real bodies is limited accordingly. The current release of Cho-Kanji V has the same limitation.

This is because the file ID is a fixed-length integer of 16 bits, and it is difficult to extend it while maintaining binary compatibility with the current system. Therefore, a redesign and implementation is needed to extend this real body constraint.

=== Real-time operation ===
The BTRON-specification OS is a real-time OS, capable of stably processing tasks that require real-time processing, such as video and audio. BTRON3 uses ITRON as a microkernel, and although care must be taken to avoid memory page-out, real-time processing is possible.

In Windows, the graphics card driver is tuned by the manufacturer, while in BTRON there is no such graphics acceleration, etc., so screen rewriting can feel slow. BTRON has short boot time, though it stems from its limited number of daemons and supported devices, which makes it less of an advantage compared to other operating systems.

=== HMI ===
Not only BTRON, but the TRON project has also standardized the human-machine interface and published it as the TRON Human Interface Standard Handbook, and BTRON's user interface is designed in accordance with this.

==== Direct Operation ====
In BTRON, basically everything on the screen can be operated with a pointing device such as a mouse or electronic pen. To make it easy even for users who are not familiar with computers, not only can the size of the window be changed, but also the selection text and graphics can be dragged and dropped directly onto drag and drop (commonly called "grab-and-poi") to move or copy.

Application launching is basically done by double-clicking or otherwise launching a temporary body that represents the actual body of a document, etc. This is the same operation as selecting an application based on meta-information such as file type and creator in Mac OS and extension linking in Windows, but BTRON In BTRON, there is basically no other way to start an application.

For example, when transcribing a new text, an application is first launched without specifying the editing target, whereas in BTRON, a template of the real body is registered along with the application, and work is started by duplicating the real body. To be more specific, open a special window called "Gather Source Papers", and from there drag a pseudo-form called "Manuscript Paper" for editing text, and drop it into the desired window. (Normally, this operation is to move the pseudostat, but due to the peculiarities of the "Paper Gathering" application, the real body of the new document is duplicated and a pseudostat is created that points to the real body.

Operations common in other operating systems, such as starting an application first and then creating a new document or loading an existing document, are not possible with BTRON. Some people find it easy to understand because it matches real-world actions such as "preparing a new paper or an existing document before writing", while others find it difficult to understand unlike other OSs. The style of selecting the subject of the operation first and then instructing the operation on it is similar to the Xerox Star or the Smalltalk system, which was more object-oriented.

==== Enableware ====
TRON, which we call "enableware", has also focused on universal design since the beginning of the project. The BTRON-specification OS allows users with various disabilities to freely change the typeface and size of menu items and actual names, the size of the mouse pointer, the size and display method of the temporary body, and the width of the window scroll bar. The design of the mouse pointer, for example, is not to be changed except in special cases, to achieve a consistent feel. To avoid confusion even when using an application for the first time, the order of menus has been standardized. Design guidelines that take into account the use of multiple languages have also been established. The above functions are also implemented in commercial TRON specification OS.

=== TRON code ===
BTRON (like OS/omicron, etc.) was designed on the premise of representing characters in 16 bits. The character code for TAD, the data format, is TRON code, which switches between multiple 16-bit planes by escaping 0xfe**, allowing the space to be expanded arbitrarily. The current implementation uses 32 bits as the internal code.

== Implementation ==
Shown in order of oldest to newest. First, Matsushita Electric Industrial and Personal Media produced a prototype of BTRON286, an implementation on a 16-bit CPU 286, assuming the CEC machine described below. The specification for this is BTRON1 (also known as BTRON/286 in the early days). Implementations based on this include "ET Master" in Matsushita Communication Industry's "PanaCAL ET", "1B/Note" in the Panacom M series sold by Personal Media, and "1B" in the "1B/V" series for PC/AT compatible machines.

For BTRON2, a specification was prepared, and its implementation on GENESYS, an evaluation machine equipped with Fujitsu's TRON chip F32/300, was planned. An implementation by Personal Media, named "2B".

MCUBE, a TRON chip machine produced by SIGBTRON, implemented "3B", which was 32-bit and used an ITRON-specification OS (ItIs) for its microkernel; implementations based on 3B included "B-rights" such as the BrainPad TiPO (V810), PC/ The specification that B-right/V conforms to is published as the BTRON3 specification. Products that include B-right/V Cho-Kanji is sold to the general public and is easy to obtain.

Although it is not called BTRON, T-Shell, a middleware for T-Kernel, provides the same functions as some of the outer shell of Cho-Kanji.

== History ==
In this section, all other descriptions not otherwise mentioned are from the "History" of the TRON Association website, referenced in the web archive.

=== Start of the BTRON sub-project ===
The earliest records include the reference to "B-TRON" in "TRON Project" in the Proceedings of the International Conference on Microcomputer Applications '84 (1984), and "TRON Total Architecture" in "TRON Total Architecture," and "Proposal of a Unified Operation Model for BTRON" in "Information Processing" Vol. 26 No. 11 (1985/Nov, 25th Anniversary Special Issue).

In 1986, the BTRON Project was fully launched as a sub-project of the TRON Project, and the BTRON Technical Committee was established in the TRON Association. The initial concept was summarized in an article in IEEE Micro's special issue on TRON (Vol. 7, No. 2 (1987/Apr)), and can be read in "TRON Introduction," a translation of the same issue.

The June 1988 issue of TRON Review contains several screen shots and a report on BTRON286 by Matsushita Electric Industrial Co.

In December 1988, the TRON Association released an outline of the "BTRON/286" specification, and the following year, in March 1989, Matsushita Electric completed a practical level machine that was designated as the "Educational PC Specification Standard Concept," which was intended for educational use as described in the next section.

=== Introduction plan for educational PCs ===
Based on the "Second Report on Educational Reform" issued by the Provisional Education Council in April 1986, the Computer Education Development Center (CEC) was established in July of the same year under the joint jurisdiction of the Ministry of Education and the Ministry of International Trade and Industry. The CEC established the Educational Software Library in April 1987, and held a symposium in July 1987. In August of the same year, CEC called for prototypes of educational personal computers under the title of "CEC Concept Model '87", and the prototypes gathered in response to the call were exhibited to the public in July of the following year, showing a willingness to show the direction of educational personal computers.

In March 1989, CEC made the decision to use TRON for personal computers to be installed in schools. This seemed to be a stepping stone to the spread of (B)TRON, but it became the subject of a complaint in the trade issue described in the next section.

The keyboard and key layout of the "educational PC" presented at this time was not based on the TRON keyboard, but on the new JIS layout.

It is not unheard of to use a product that does not have a large market share for educational use, such as the Acorn Computer in the UK.

=== Trade Issues ===
In 1989, a report by the Office of the United States Trade Representative cited TRON as a trade barrier in Japan.

The details are as follows: "1989 National Trade Estimate Report on Foreign Trade Barriers" ("Report on Foreign Trade Barriers" (ISSN 0898-3887 1989)) issued by the USTR on April 12, 1989. Other Barriers" in the report on Japan's trade barriers in "1989 National Trade Estimate Report on Foreign Trade Barriers" ("Report on Foreign Trade Barriers" (ISSN 0898-3887) 1989 edition), in Section 7 "7. In Section 7 "7. OTHER BARRIERS", TRON was one of those listed with subsections such as "Large-scale Retail Stores Act". The naming of specific systems is bizarre compared to the others, which basically list fields.

The report points out that several US companies are also members of the TRON Association, but no US company is in a position to sell TRON-based PCs or communication devices, and that the Japanese government's support for TRON could give Japanese manufacturers an advantage, especially in the education sector (referring to the aforementioned CEC) and communication sector (referring to NTT's adoption of CTRON), which is already happening.

Furthermore, he points out that in the education field, TRON has enabled the emergence of US OS (specifically MS-DOS, OS/2, UNIX is being excluded from the huge new market, and that in the long run TRON could affect the entire market of electronics in Japan. The last paragraph of the report states that already on September 9, 1988 (and later), the U.S. had informed Japan of its interest in these matters, and that in March 1989 negotiations were underway to provide detailed specifications for NTT's requirements, and that further information on TRON was being investigated through the Japanese government. The report concludes.

The TRON Association protested in writing to the USTR representative in May, and TRON was removed. However, in June of the same year, the mass media reported "abandonment of BTRON adoption for educational PCs". For example, "Nikkei Computer" reported "BTRON-based educational PCs: Standardization virtually impossible". Although there were twists and turns, in the end, the introduction of BTRON proposed by CEC was not implemented, and what was introduced to school education was MS-DOS machines, including the PC-9801. This led to a period of stagnation for the TRON project, especially the BTRON project, with some labeling it as a "failure.

The background to this uproar is that in the 1990s, NEC had the majority share of the PC market, and at the time of the CEC selection in 1988, it was opposed by a coalition of all other companies, led by Matsushita, which also included IBM, "For example, note 25 of "TRON Today" in Shozaburo Nakamura's Dennou Mandara (1995 edition) says, "At the time, the anti-TRON forces were NEC and Microsoft, which had already established themselves. It is a well-known fact that NEC and Microsoft had already established their positions. In addition to the long-standing Japan-US trade friction, there was also the Japan-US high-tech friction of the 1980s, Japan bashing, the Nippon K.K. theory, the IBM industrial espionage case, and the cover illustration of the September 1983 issue of CACM, was still fresh in our minds, and TRON itself was still in its infancy. IEEE Micro ran a special issue on TRON (April 1987, for example), and there were factors that would have made TRON stand out in the US.

According to Eiji Oshita's "Masayoshi Son: The Young Lion of Entrepreneurship," Masayoshi Son, who had been working hard for some time to create an industry structure that would make his own business, software distribution, profitable, was agitated that TRON would cause Japanese industry to fall behind global standards and be left behind by the rest of the world. Masayoshi Son, who had been working hard to set up the industry so that it could profit from TRON, was about to "lay the rails for the destruction of TRON" with Yuji Tanahashi (then Director General of the Machinery and Information Industry Bureau) and Ryozo Hayashi (then Director of the Information Processing Promotion Division), who were introduced by Akio Morita. The Ministry of International Trade and Industry (MITI) stopped the introduction of TRON into schools. The book's headline reads "Stopping the spread of TRON at the water's edge".

There was an unusual display of opinion on the part of the TRON project on this matter. In the 60th issue of TRONWARE magazine edited and published by Personal Media Corporation (December 1999), p. 71, an article titled "People who blocked the TRON project" signed by the editorial staff introduced the aforementioned biography as someone who published a book "boasting of his achievements" (in blocking TRON). The article introduced Sun's opposition to the MSX and his apparent support for UNIX. Sakamura's testimony about the conference where Sun, Kazuhiko Nishi, and Sakamura got together was that it was supposed to be a conference for Unix engineers, and that he and Nishi talked about technology, but Sun talked about business and seemed to be out of place. But overall, the article sums up the situation as "Is it right to destroy the seeds of original technology?

In December 1988, Softbank (then Softbank Japan Corp.) Publishing Department (now Softbank Creative) published a book titled "The Tron Revolution" (ISBN 4-89052-037-6).

=== PanaCAL ET ===
In preparation for the inclusion of "information" in the optional content of junior high school technology courses from 1993, the Ministry of Education started the "Educational Computer Assistance Program" in 1990.

In conjunction with this, Matsushita Communication Industrial released the PanaCAL ET, an educational personal computer equipped with the BTRON286-based OS "ET Master" as a BTRON machine. The hardware was based on the Panacom M, with enhanced 24-dot font ROM and other features for educational use.

However, most of the machines introduced to schools at this time were PC-9800 series, probably because they could inherit BASIC programs and data from word processing software, which had already been created in large numbers by enterprising teachers.

=== 90s onwards ===
(Stub) The addition of this section is desired.

- December 1989 BTRON1 software specification released.
- December 1989 Development of a reservation system using BTRON by Japan Airlines
- 1990 Matsushita Communication Industrial releases PanaCAL ET equipped with BTRON1 specification (based on BTRON286) "ET Master
- 1991 Release of 1B/Note
- 1994 Release of 1B/V1, a general-purpose PC/AT compatible machine
- 1995 Release of 1B/V2
- 1996 Release of BrainPad TiPO
- 1996 Release of 1B/V3
- 1998 Release of B-right/V
- 1999 Release of Cho-Kanji (B-right/V R2)
- 2000 Release of Cho-Kanji 2 (B-right/V R2.5)
- 2000 Release of GT typeface
- 2001 Release of Cho-Kanji 3 (B-right/V R3)
- 2001 T-Engine and T-Kernel released
- 2001 Release of Cho-Kanji 4 (B-right/V R4)
- 2006 Cho-Kanji V (B-right/V R4.5)

== External sources ==
- Linux Insider, "The Most Popular Operating System in the World", October 15, 2003. Retrieved July 13, 2006.
- BTRON Introduction
