= T-Engine Forum =

Non-profit organization

T-Engine Forum was a non-profit organization which developed an open standard for real time embedded system development and developed ubiquitous computing environment. It maintained the open specification for ITRON Specification OS, and developed T-Kernel and ubiquitous ID architecture. The chair of T-Engine Forum was Dr. Ken Sakamura. T-Engine Forum was formed in 2002 and existed until its name was changed into TRON Forum in 2015.

== History ==
In 1984 TRON Project was started by Dr. Ken Sakamura of the University of Tokyo. The project's goal was to design an open real-time OS (RTOS) kernel(s). The TRON framework tries to define complete architecture for different computing application scenarios. For different scenarios, the need for different OS kernels was identified. (See, for example, papers written in English in TRON Project 1988) ITRON specification OS for industrial applications became the most popular TRON RTOS. ITRON specification promotion was done by the various companies which sold the commercial implementations. The focus of these activities was a non-profit organization called TRON Association which acted as the communication hub for the parties concerned with the development of ITRON specification OS and its users in many fields including home electronics, smart house industry, etc.

In 2002, T-Engine Forum was formed to provide an open source RTOS implementation that supersedes the ITRON specification OS, and provides binary compatibility additionally. The new RTOS was T-Kernel. The activities of TRON Association to support TRON Project were taken over by T-Engine Forum in 2010.

In 2015, T-Engine Forum changed its name into TRON Forum.

== Organization ==
As of July 2011 there were 266 members in T-Engine Forum. Executive Committee members include Japanese companies such as Fujitsu, Hitachi, NTT DoCoMo and Denso. A-members were involved in the design and development of the specifications for T-Engine and T-Kernel, or of Ubiquitous ID technology. They include companies such as NEC and Yamaha Corporation. B-members were involved in the development of products using T-Engine specification and T-Kernel. They include companies like ARM, Freescale, MIPS Technologies, Mitsubishi, Robert Bosch GmbH, Sony Corporation, Toshiba and Xilinx. The supporting members and academic members include many universities like the University of Tokyo, Japan and Dalian Maritime University, China.

As noted above, TRON Forum has overtaken the work which used to be done by former T-Engine Forum since 2015.

== See also ==
- TRON Project
- ITRON
- T-Kernel
