= IEEE Micro =

Academic journal

- Discipline: Computer science
- Language: English
- Edited by: Hsien-Hsin Sean Lee

Publication details
- History: 1981–present
- Publisher: IEEE Computer Society
- Frequency: Bimonthly
- Impact factor: 3.6 (2022)

Standard abbreviations
- ISO 4: IEEE Micro

Indexing
- CODEN: IEMIDZ
- ISSN: 0272-1732 (print); 1937-4143 (web)
- LCCN: 81645663

Links
- Journal homepage

IEEE Micro is a bimonthly peer-reviewed scientific journal published by the IEEE Computer Society covering small systems and semiconductor chips, including integrated circuit processes and practices, project management, development tools and infrastructure, as well as chip design and architecture, empirical evaluations of small system and IC technologies and techniques, and human and social aspects of system development.

== Editors-in-chief ==
The following people are or have been editor-in-chief:

- 2024–present: Hsien-Hsin Sean Lee
- 2019–2023: Lizy Kurian John
- 2015–2018: Lieven Eeckhout
- 2011–2014: Erik R. Altman
- 2007–2010: David H. Albonesi
- 2003–2006: Pradip Bose
- 1999–2001: Ken Sakamura
- 1995–1998: Steve Diamond
- 1991–1994: Dante Del Corso
- 1987–1990: Joe Hootman
- 1985–1987: James J. Farrell III
- 1983–1984: Peter Rony and Tom Cain
- 1980–1982: Richard C. Jaeger
