= Ucode =

Ucode or μcode may refer to:

- Microcode (μcode), low-level control data or instructions
- Unicode, a character encoding standard
- ucode system, an identification number system for tagging real world objects uniquely
