= Lizy =

Lizy may refer to:

== People ==
- Lizy John, Indian-American electrical engineer,
- Lizy Tagliani (born 1970), Argentinian actress, comedian, and presenter

== Places ==
- Lizy, Aisne, France
- Lizy-sur-Ourcq, France
