= Micro T-Kernel =

Real-time operating system for microcontrollers

μT-Kernel
- μT-Kernel 3.0 logo
- Developer: TRON Forum
- Written in: C, Assembly language
- OS family: TRON
- Working state: Current
- Initial release: 2007; 18 years ago
- Latest release: 3.00.07 / April 1, 2024; 19 months ago
- Repository: github.com/tron-forum/mtkernel_3
- Marketing target: Embedded systems
- Available in: English, and Japanese
- Supported platforms
- Kernel type: Real-time operating system (RTOS)
- License: T-License 2.2
- Official website: www.tron.org/tron-project/what-is-t-kernel/mt-kernel

μT-Kernel is an open source real-time operating system (RTOS) designed for 16- and 8-bit microcontrollers. "μ” in the name stands for "micro" and pronounced as such. It is not pronounced as "mu". It is freely available under T-License.

Supported CPU list is available.

The latest version, μT-Kernel 3.0, is available from GitHub.

μT-Kernel was standardized by T-Engine Forum (now merged into TRON Forum) and later it became the basis of IEEE Standard 2050-2018, "IEEE Standard for a Real-Time Operating System (RTOS) for Small-Scale Embedded Systems" published by the Institute of Electrical and Electronics Engineers (IEEE) Standards Association (IEEE SA).

Its specification is available both in English and Japanese. The source code is available from the TRON Forum website and GitHub.

An article comparing nine RTOSs in which μT-Kernel was evaluated and given favorable remarks appeared in IEEE publication.

== History ==
μT-Kernel was developed as a smaller subset of T-Kernel, a full-featured real-time operating system. For example, it does not assume the use of MMU unlike the original T-Kernel. For more on its history and the overall philosophy behind the TRON real-time OS family, please see the entry of T-Kernel.

== See also ==
- T-Kernel
