= T-License =

- Author: TRON Forum
- Latest version: 2.2
- Publisher: TRON Forum
- Published: April 1, 2020; 6 years ago
- Website: T-License

T-License is the software license used by TRON Forum for distributing the source code of its real-time operating systems (RTOSs) such as T-Kernel and Micro T-Kernel (often written as μT-Kernel: μ pronounced as "micro", not "mu"). The license fee is free if products are developed according to T-License conditions.

The current version of T-License is version 2.2.

T-License has been created to fit the need of embedded computer system market where the source code may contain information tied to proprietary hardware information.

So, unlike GNU General Public License, T-License does not require the release of the (modified) source code of a program even if such a program is used by a third party.

The requirement to express that the use of T-Kernel or μT-Kernel by a logo in a product somewhere on the product itself or the manual can be alleviated by a TRON Forum member. Because of this, not all products released in the market that use T-Kernel or μT-Kernel mention the use of the RTOS inside.

== Usage Examples ==
As noted above, not all the products mention the use of T-Kernel or μT-Kernel.

Here are some examples of products or companies whose online manual refers to T-License because they either use T-Kernel or μT-Kernel.

- A licensing sheet that is provided for Brother TD-4000 printer.:
- A Samsung network camera.The Japanese manual refers to T-License on page 122.
- Clarion's open source web page (in Japanese) which lists the T-License among other licenses under which their products have been produced.:
- Extended T-Kernel RTOS from eSOL.:
- Customized ports of T-Kernel from Personal Media Corp. (in Japanese):
- "OpenTK", an enhanced version of T-Kernel with MMU support, etc. (in Japanese)

There are other products that use T-Kernel or μT-Kernel under T-License. Some of them are listed at the TRON Forum web page (in Japanese).

== History ==
T-License was originally proposed by T-Engine Forum, which was merged into the current TRON Forum.

There is an online PDF Japanese article that explains the motivation behind T-License that was born with T-Engine, a hardware platform for developing IoT applications.

According to the original version of T-License, changing or modifying the T-Kernel source code could only be done by certain parties like A-members of T-Engine Forum and these parties must notify and register their changes with T-Engine Forum.

But this restriction has been mostly lifted since the 2.0 version, which has been in force since May, 2011.

== See also ==
- TRON Project
- T-Engine
- T-Kernel
