= Lizy John =

Indian American electrical engineer

Lizy Kurian John is an Indian American electrical engineer, who is currently the Truchard Foundation Chair in Engineering in the Department of Electrical and Computer Engineering at the University of Texas at Austin. She received her Ph.D. in computer engineering from The Pennsylvania State University in 1993. She joined The University of Texas Austin faculty in 1996. Her research is in the areas of computer architecture, multicore processors, memory systems, performance evaluation and benchmarking, workload characterization, and reconfigurable computing.

Professor John's research has been supported by the National Science Foundation, Semiconductor Research Corporation (SRC), DARPA, Lockheed Martin, AMD, Oracle, Huawei, IBM, Intel, Motorola, Freescale, Dell, Samsung, Texas Instruments, etc.. She is recipient of NSF CAREER award (1996), UT Austin Engineering Foundation Faculty Award (2001), Halliburton, Brown and Root Engineering Foundation Young Faculty Award (1999), University of Texas Alumni Association Teaching Award (2004), The Pennsylvania State University Outstanding Engineering Alumnus (2011) etc.

Professor John holds 21 U. S. patents and has published 16 book chapters, approximately 300 journal and conference and workshop papers. She has coauthored books on Digital Systems Design using VHDL (Cengage Publishers 2007, 2017), Digital Systems Design using Verilog (Cengage Publishers, 2014) and has edited a book on Computer Performance Evaluation and Benchmarking (CRC Press). She has also edited three books on workload characterization.

Professor John was the Editor-in-Chief (EIC) of IEEE MICRO during 2019-2023 and has served in the editorial boards of IEEE Transactions on Computers, ACM Transactions on Architecture and Code Optimizations (TACO), IEEE Computer Architecture Letters, IEEE Transactions on Sustainable Computing, and IEEE Transactions on VLSI. She is a member of IEEE, IEEE Computer Society, ACM, and ACM SIGARCH.

John was named a Fellow of IEEE in 2009, a Fellow of the National Academy of Inventors in 2020, and a Fellow of the Association for Computing Machinery (ACM) in 2020 and a Fellow of the American Association for the Advancement of Science (AAAS) in 2024.

[1][2]
