= TRON project =

Real-time operating system

TRON (The Real-time Operating system Nucleus) is an open architecture real-time operating system kernel design. The project was started by Ken Sakamura of the University of Tokyo in 1984. The project's goal is to create an ideal computer architecture and network, to provide for all of society's needs. For different scenarios, the need for different OS kernels was identified. (See, for example, papers written in English in TRON Project 1988)

The Industrial TRON (ITRON) derivative was one of the world's most used operating systems in 2003, being present in billions of electronic devices such as mobile phones, appliances and even cars. Although mainly used by Japanese companies, it garnered interest worldwide. However, a dearth of quality English documentation was said to hinder its broader adoption. The situation has improved since TRON Forum has taken over the activities to support TRON Project since 2015. (See the specification page that lists many English documents. )

The focus of these activities was a non-profit organization called TRON Association which acted as the communication hub for the parties concerned with the development of ITRON specification OS and its users in many fields including home electronics, smart house industry, etc.

In 2002, T-Engine Forum was formed to provide an open source RTOS implementation that supersedes the ITRON specification OS, and provides binary compatibility additionally. The new RTOS was T-Kernel. The activities of TRON Association to support TRON Project were taken over by T-Engine Forum in 2010. In 2015, T-Engine Forum changed its name into TRON Forum.

Today, ITRON specification OS and T-Kernel RTOS are supported by popular Secure Socket Layer (SSL) and Transport Layer Security (TLS) libraries such as wolfSSL.

== History ==
In 1984, the TRON project was officially launched. In 1985, NEC announced the first ITRON implementation based on the ITRON/86 specification. In 1986, the TRON Kyogikai (unincorporated TRON Association) was established, Hitachi announced its ITRON implementation based on the ITRON/68K specification, and the first TRON project symposium is held. In 1987, Fujitsu announced an ITRON implementation based on the ITRON/MMU specification. Mitsubishi Electric announced an ITRON implementation based on the ITRON/32 specification, and Hitachi introduced the Gmicro/200 32-bit microprocessor based on the TRON VLSI CPU specification.

In 1988, BTRON computer prototypes were being tested in various schools across Japan as the planned standardized computer for education. The project was organized by both the Ministry of International Trade and Industry and the Ministry of Education. However, Scott Callon of Stanford University writes that the project ran into some issues, such as BTRON being incompatible with existing DOS-based PCs and software. At the time NEC controlled 80–90% of the education market with DOS infrastructure, so adopting BTRON would have meant getting rid of all existing infrastructure. The existing incompatible PC software had also been personally written by school personnel, who opposed BTRON for this incompatibility with their earlier projects. There was also no software yet for the brand new computer. The project was additionally at least a year behind schedule and didn't perform better than earlier systems although that had been promised, which was possibly affected by the OS having been made by a firm that hadn't written one before. Because of these reasons, at the end of 1988 the Ministry of Education decided that it would not support the project unless BTRON was also made compatible with DOS. The Ministry of International Trade and Industry had hoped to avoid supporting NEC's domination of the PC market with DOS.

BTRON integration with NEC DOS architecture was difficult but possible with negotiation. In April 1989 the Office of the U.S. Trade Representative issued a preliminary report accusing BTRON of being a trade barrier, as it only functioned in Japan, and asked the Japanese government not to make it standard in schools. TRON was included along with rice, semiconductors, and telecommunications equipment in a list of items targeted by Super-301 (complete stop of import based on section 301 of the Omnibus Trade and Competitiveness Act of 1988). It was removed from the list after the USTR inspection team visited the TRON Association in May. In June the Japanese government expressed their regret at U.S. intervention but accepted this request not to make it standard in schools, thus ending the BTRON project. Callon opines that the project had nevertheless run into such difficulties that the U.S. intervention allowed the government to save face from cancelling the project.

According to a report from The Wall Street Journal, in 1989 US officials feared that TRON could undercut American dominance in computers, but that in the end PC software and chips based on the TRON technology proved no match for Windows and Intel's processors as a global standard. In the 1980s Microsoft had at least once lobbied Washington about TRON until backing off, but Ken Sakamura himself believed Microsoft wasn't the impetus behind the Super-301 listing in 1989. Known for his off the cuff remarks, in 2004 governor of Tokyo Shintaro Ishihara mentioned in his column post concerning international trade policy that TRON was dropped because Carla Anderson Hills had threatened Ryutaro Hashimoto over it.

On 10 November 2017, TRON Forum, headquartered in Tokyo, Japan, which has been maintaining the TRON Project since 2010, has agreed with the Institute of Electrical and Electronics Engineers, headquartered in the US, to share the copyrights of TRON μT-Kernel 2.0 specification, the most recent version of T-Kernel (the successor of the original ITRON) for free. This was to facilitate the creation of IEEE standard of RTOS based on μT-Kernel specification.

Stephen Dukes, Standards Committee, vice chair, IEEE Consumer Electronics Society of that time said that IEEE will "accelerate standards development and streamline global distribution" through the agreement.

On September 11, 2018, "IEEE 2050-2018 - IEEE Standard for a Real-Time Operating System (RTOS) for Small-Scale Embedded Systems", a standard based on "μT-Kernel 2.0 was officially approved as an IEEE standard.

In May 2023, the IEEE recognized the RTOS, proposed, created, and released by TRON Project, as an IEEE Milestone, titled "TRON Real-time Operating System Family, 1984." The certified Milestone plaque is installed on the campus of the University of Tokyo, where Ken Sakamura, the leader of TRON Project, worked as a research assistant in 1984.

== Architecture ==
TRON does not specify the source code for the kernel, but instead is a "set of interfaces and design guidelines" for creating the kernel. This allows different companies to create their own versions of TRON, based on the specifications, which can be suited for different microprocessors.

While the specification of TRON is publicly available, implementations can be proprietary at the discretion of the implementer.

The TRON framework defines a complete architecture for the different computing units:

- ITRON (Industrial TRON): an architecture for real-time operating systems for embedded systems; this is the most popular use of the TRON architecture
  - JTRON (Java TRON): a sub-project of ITRON to allow it to use the Java platform
- BTRON (Business TRON): for personal computers, workstations, PDAs, mainly as the human–machine interface in networks based on the TRON architecture
- CTRON (Central and Communications TRON): for mainframe computers, digital switching equipment
- MTRON (Macro TRON): for intercommunication between the different TRON components.
- STRON (Silicon TRON): hardware implementation of a real-time kernel.
- TRON (encoding), a way that TRON represents characters (as opposed to Unicode).

== Administration ==
The TRON project was administered by the TRON Association for a long time. After it was integrated into T-Engine Forum in 2010, and T-Engine Forum changed its name to TRON Forum in 2015, TRON Forum has supported the TRON Project by acting as the communication hub for the parties involved.

== See also ==
- ITRON
- T-Kernel
- Micro T-Kernel
