= Ken Sakamura =

Japanese computer scientist (born 1951)

- 坂村 健
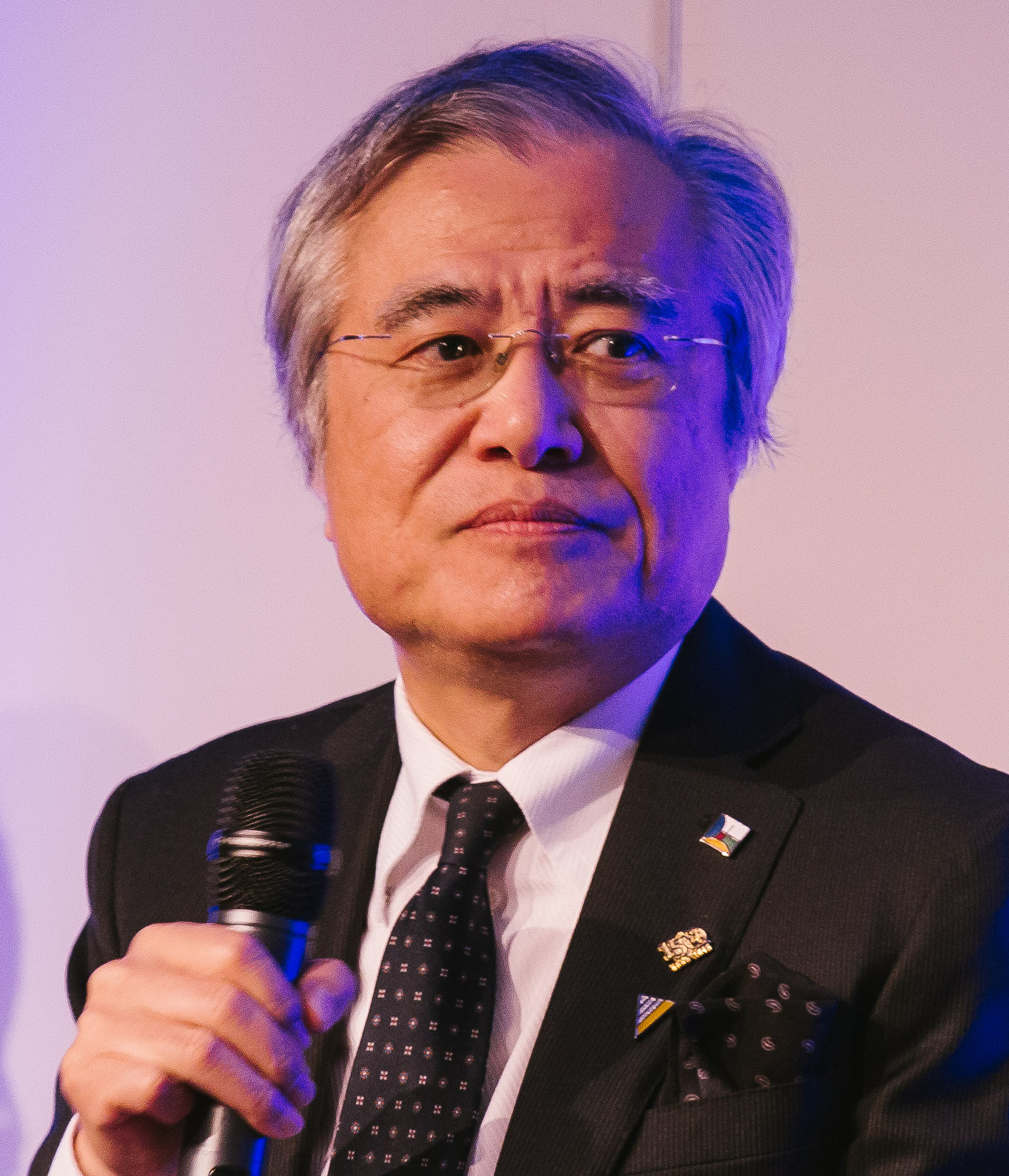
- Born: 25 July 1951 (age 74); Tokyo, Japan
- Education: Keio University, 1974–1979
- Known for: TRON project
- Awards: Takeda Award
- Scientific career
- Institutions: University of Tokyo; Toyo University

Ken Sakamura (坂村 健, Sakamura Ken; born 25 July 1951 in Tokyo, Japan), as of April 2017, is a Japanese professor and dean of the Faculty of Information Networking for Innovation and Design at Toyo University, Japan. He is a former professor in information science at the University of Tokyo (through March 2017). He is the creator of the real-time operating system (RTOS) architecture TRON.

In 2001, he shared the Takeda Award for Social/Economic Well-Being with Richard Stallman and Linus Torvalds.

== Career ==
As of 2006, Sakamura leads the ubiquitous networking laboratory (UNL), located in Gotanda, Tokyo, and the T-Engine forum for consumer electronics. The joint goal of Sakamura's ubiquitous networking specification and the T-Engine forum, is to enable any everyday device to broadcast and receive information. It is essentially a TRON variant, paired with a competing standard to radio-frequency identification (RFID).

Since the foundation of the T-Engine forum, Sakamura has been working on opening Japanese technology to the world. His prior brainchild, TRON, the universal RTOS used in Japanese consumer electronics has had limited adoption in other countries. Sakamura has signed deals with Chinese and Korean universities to work together on ubiquitous networking. He has also worked with French software component manufacturer NexWave Solutions, Inc. He is an external board member for Nippon Telegraph and Telephone (NTT), Japan.

== Ubiquitous Communicator ==
The Ubiquitous Communicator (UC) is a mobile computing device designed by Sakamura for use in ubiquitous computing. On 15 September 2004, YRP-UNL announced in Japan that it had begun producing a new model after creating five prototypes over three years. The model was used in trial tests circa late 2004. The new model, weighing about 196 grams, contains new features: RFID reader compatible for ucode, a two megapixel charge-coupled device (CCD) camera, a secondary 300,000 pixel camera for videotelephony, support for wireless network technologies, Bluetooth, Wi-Fi, and IrDA, VoIP phone feature, SD and mini-SD memory card slots, fingerprint authentication, and encryption coprocessor as options. It was expected to be sold for ¥300,000, $2,700.

== Honors ==
In May 2015, Sakamura received the prestigious ITU150 award from the International Telecommunication Union (ITU), along with Bill Gates, Robert E. Kahn, Thomas Wiegand, Mark I. Krivosheyev, and Martin Cooper. The following is the citation given by ITU:

... Today, the real-time operating systems based on the TRON specifications are used for engine control on automobiles, mobile phones, digital cameras, and many other appliances, and are believed to be the among most popular operating systems for embedded computers around world. The R&D results from TRON Project are useful for ubiquitous computing. For example, UNL joined the standardization efforts at ITU-T and helped produce a series of Recommendations, including H.642 “Multimedia information access triggered by tag-based identification”. The idea behind H.642 series is based on de facto “ucode” standard developed by UNL for communication in the age of the Internet of Things ... For his achievements, Sakamura has won many awards: Takeda Award, the Medal with Purple Ribbon from the Japanese government, Okawa Prize, Prime Minister Award, and Japan Academy Prize. He is a fellow and the golden core member of the IEEE Computer Society.
