= Arduino Nano =

Single-board microcontroller

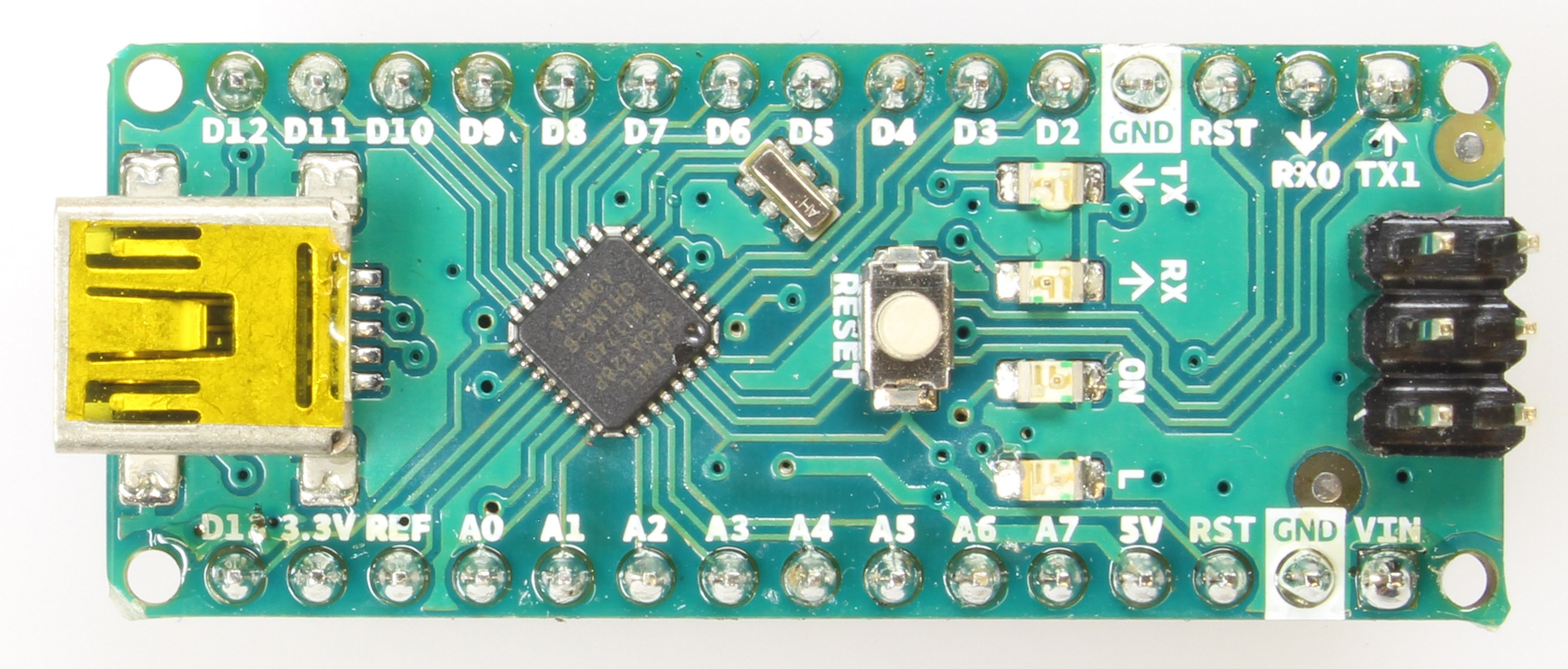
- Arduino Nano with ATmega328P MCU
- Developer: arduino.cc
- Manufacturer: Many
- Type: Single-board microcontroller
- Availability: Nano webpage
- Operating system: None
- CPU: Microchip AVR (8-bit) at 16 MHz
- Memory: 2 KB SRAM
- Storage: 32 KB Flash; 1 KB EEPROM

The Arduino Nano is an open-source breadboard-friendly microcontroller board based on the Microchip ATmega328P microcontroller (MCU) and developed by Arduino.cc and initially released in 2008. It offers the same connectivity and specs of the Arduino Uno board in a smaller form factor.

The Arduino Nano is equipped with 30 male I/O headers, in a DIP-30-like configuration, which can be programmed using the Arduino Software integrated development environment (IDE), which is common to all Arduino boards and running both online and offline. The board can be powered through its USB Mini‑B receptacle or from a 9 V battery.

== History ==
In 2008, the Arduino Nano was released.

In 2019, Arduino released the Arduino Nano Every, a pin-equivalent of the Nano, which features a ATmega4809 microcontroller (MCU).

In 2025, Arduino released the Arduino Nano R4, a pin-equivalent of the Nano, which features an ARM Cortex-M4F based R7FA4M1AB microcontroller and a USB-C connector.

== Technical specifications ==
=== Nano "R3" ===
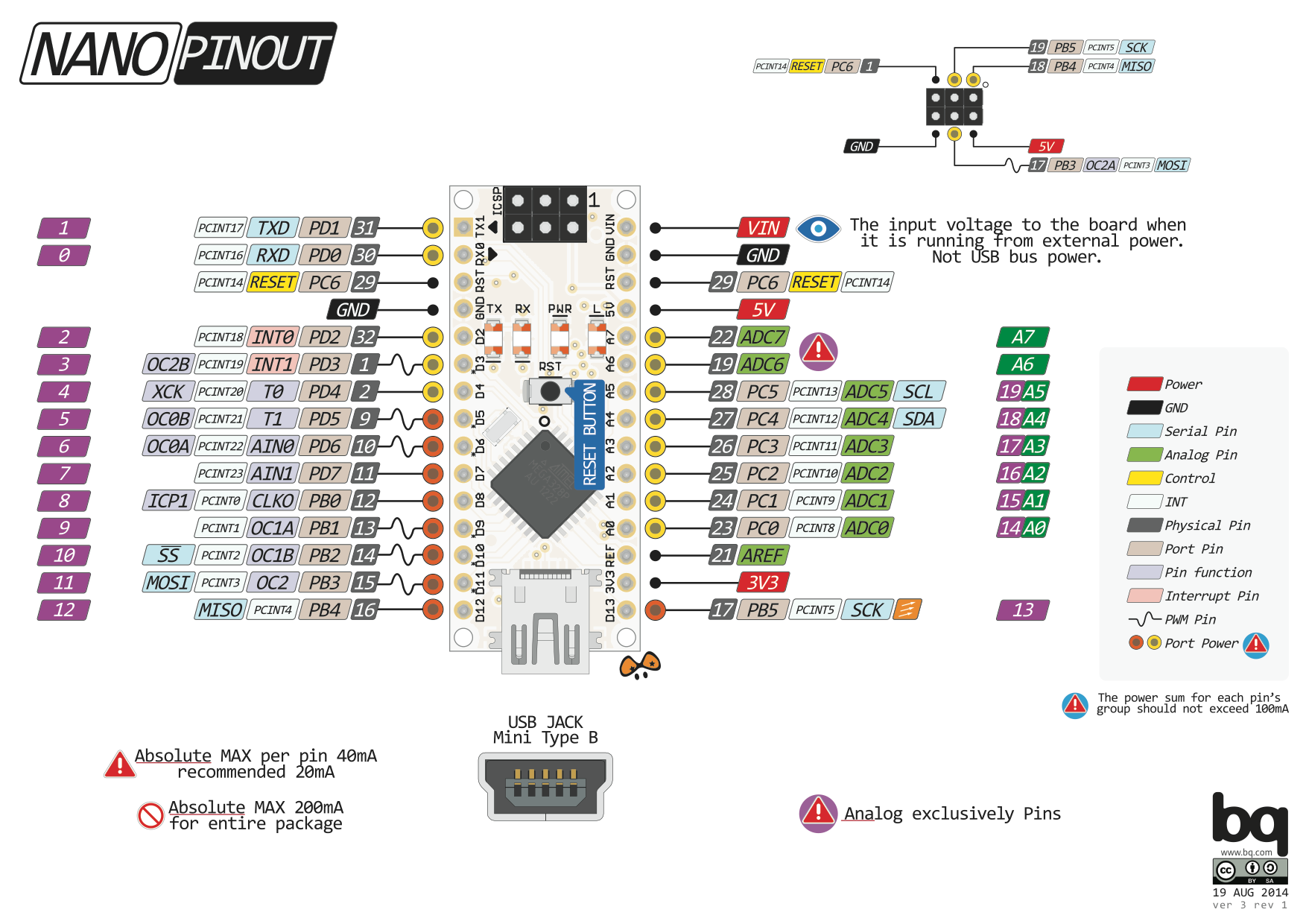

Microcontroller (MCU):

- IC: Microchip ATmega328P (8-bit AVR core)
- Clock Speed: 16 MHz (on Nano board), though IC supports 20 MHz maximum at 5 Volts
- Flash memory: 32 KB, of which 1.5 KB used by the bootloader
- SRAM: 2 KB
- EEPROM: 1 KB
- USART peripherals: 1 (Arduino software default configures USART as a 8N1 UART)
- SPI peripherals: 1
- I²C peripherals: 1
- Operating Voltage: 5 Volts (on Nano board), though IC supports 1.8 to 5.5 Volts (some 3rd-party Nano variations support 3.3V)

Board:

- Connectors:

- Nano 30-pin male pin headers (DIP-30W), two rows of 15-pins, 0.6-inch row-to-row, 2.54mm-pitch (bottom side) (board available without pins too)
- Mini-USB Type-B (top side) (some 3rd-party Nano variations have other USB connectors)
- ICSP 6-pin male pin header, 2x3, 2.54mm-pitch (top side)

- VIN pin input voltage: 7 to 12 Volts
- Digital I/O pins: 14 (6 optional PWM outputs)
- Analog input pins: 8
- DC per I/O pin: 40 mA
- DC for 3.3 V pin: 50 mA
- Length: 45 mm
- Width: 18 mm
- Mass: 7 g

=== Nano R4 ===
Microcontroller (MCU):

- IC: Renesas R7FA4M1AB (32-bit ARM Cortex-M4F core with single-precision FPU)
- Clock Speed: 48 MHz
- Flash memory: 256 KB + bootrom
- SRAM: 32 KB (16 KB ECC) (16 KB parity)
- EEPROM: 8 KB data flash
- USART peripherals: 4
- SPI peripherals: 2
- I²C peripherals: 2
- Operating Voltage: 5 Volts (on Nano R4 board), though IC supports 1.6 to 5.5 Volts

Board:

- Connectors:

- Nano 30-pin male pin headers (DIP-30W), two rows of 15-pins, 0.6-inch row-to-row, 2.54mm-pitch (bottom side) (board available without pins too)
- USB-C (top side)
- Qwiic, 3.3-Volt I2C bus, 4-pin 1.00mm-pitch JST SH (top side)

- VIN pin input voltage: 6 to 21 Volts

== Communication ==
The Arduino Nano has a number of facilities for communicating with a computer, another Arduino, or other microcontrollers. The ATmega328 provides UART TTL serial (5V) communication, which is available on digital pins 0 (RX) and 1 (TX).

An FTDI FT232RL on the board channels this serial communication over USB and the FTDI drivers (included with the Arduino firmware) provide a virtual com port to software on the computer. The Arduino software includes a serial monitor which allows simple textual data to be sent to and from the Arduino board. The RX and TX LEDs on the board flash when data is being transmitted via the FTDI chip and the USB connection to the computer (but not for serial communication on pins 0 and 1). A SoftwareSerial library allows for serial communication on any of the Nano's digital pins. The ATmega328 also supports I2C and SPI communication. The Arduino software includes the Wire library to simplify use of the I2C bus.

=== Automatic (software) reset ===
Rather than requiring a physical press of the reset button before an upload, the Arduino Nano is designed in a way that allows it to be reset by software running on a connected computer. One of the hardware flow control lines (DTR) of the FT232RL is connected to the reset line of the ATmega328 via a 100 nanofarad capacitor. When this line is asserted (taken low), the reset line drops long enough to reset the chip.

This setup has other implications. When the Nano is connected to a computer running Mac OS X or Linux, it resets each time a connection is made to it from software (via USB). For the following half-second or so, the bootloader is running on the Nano. While it is programmed to ignore malformed data (i.e. anything besides an upload of new code), it will intercept the first few bytes of data sent to the board after a connection is opened.

== Arduino board comparison ==
The following table compares official Arduino boards, and has a similar layout as a table in the Arduino Uno article. The table is split with dark bars into three high-level microcontroller groups: 8-bit AVR cores, 32-bit ARM Cortex-M cores, and 32-bit ESP32 microcontrollers. Though 3rd-party boards have similar board names it doesn't automatically mean they are 100% identical to official Arduino boards. 3rd-party boards often have a different voltage regulator / different USB-to-UART chip / different color solder mask, and some have a different USB connector or additional features, too.

Board Name & Part#	Board Size Group	Board Commun- ication	MCU Part# & Pins	MCU I/O Voltage	MCU Core	MCU Clock	MCU Flash	MCU SRAM	MCU EEPROM	MCU USART & UART	MCU SPI	MCU I²C	MCU Other Bus Peripherals	MCU Timers 32/24/16/8 /WD/RT/RC	MCU ADC & DAC	MCU Engines
Nano, A000005	Nano	USB-Mini-B	ATmega328P, 32 pin	5V (1.8-5.5V)	8bit AVR	16 MHz*	32 KB	2 KB	1 KB	1, 0	1	1	None	0, 0, 1, 2, WD	10bit, None	None
Nano Every, ABX00028	Nano	USB-Micro-B	ATmega4809, 48 pin	5V (1.8-5.5V)	8bit AVR	20 MHz	48 KB	6 KB	0.25 KB	4*, 0	1	1	None	0, 0, 5, 0, WD, RT	10bit, None	None
Nano R4, ABX00143,	Nano	USB-C	R7FA4M1AB, 64 pin	5V (1.6-5.5V)	32bit ARM; Cortex-M4F (FPU)	48 MHz	256 KB + bootrom	32 KB (ECC) (parity)	None + 8 KB data flash	4, 0	2	2	USB-FS, CAN-A/B	2, 0, 8, 0, WD, RC, 24bit SysTick	14bit, 12bit	DMA x4, CRC, RNG, Crypto, Touch, LCD
Nano 33 IoT, ABX00027	Nano	USB-Micro-B, WiFi, Bluetooth	ATSAMD21G18, 48 pin	3.3V (1.62-3.63V)	32bit ARM; Cortex-M0+	48 MHz	256 KB	32 KB	None	6*, 0	None	None	USB-FS, I²S*	0, 4, 5, 0, WD, RC, 24bit SysTick	12bit, 10bit	DMA x12, CRC32, Touch
Nano RP2040; Connect, ABX00052	Nano	USB-Micro-B, WiFi, Bluetooth	RP2040, 56 pin	3.3V (1.62-3.63V)	32bit ARM; Cortex-M0+ (dual core)	133 MHz both cores	None + bootrom + 16 MB (ext)	264 KB	None	0, 2*	2*	2*	USB-FS, 8pin Prog I/O	4, 0, 8, 0, WD, RC, 24bit SysTick	12bit, None	DMA x2
Nano ESP32, ABX00092	Nano	USB-C, WiFi, Bluetooth	NORA-W106-10B; 82 pad Module, containing ESP32-S3 IC	3.3V (3.0-3.6V)	32bit Xtensa LX7 (dual core) (FPU)	240 MHz both cores	None + bootrom + 16 MB (ext)	512 KB SRAM + 16 KB SRAM + 8 MB PSRAM	None + 224 byte OTP eFuse	0, 3*	4*	2*	USB-FS, CAN-A/B*, I²S*, SD*	0, 0, 0, 0, WD, 54bit x4, 52bit System	12bit x2, None	DMA x10, Crypto, Touch, LCD*, Camera*, WiFi, Bluetooth, CoProcessor x2

Table notes

- Board Size Group column - Simplified board dimension size grouping: Nano means similar size as Arduino Nano board. This table has a similar layout as a table in the Arduino Uno article.
- MCU Part# / Pins column - MCU means microcontroller. All MCU information in this table was sourced from official datasheets in this column. The pin count is useful to determine the quantity of internal MCU features that are available. All MCU hardware features may not be available at the Nano header pins because the MCU IC package has more pins than the 30 header pins on the Nano board (*).
- MCU I/O Voltage column - Microcontrollers on official Arduino boards are powered at a fixed voltage of either 3.3 or 5 volts. The voltage rating of the microcontroller is stated inside parenthesis, though Arduino boards don't support this full range.
- MCU Clock column - MHz means 10^{6} Hertz. The ATmega328P MCU is rated for a maximum of 20 MHz, but the Nano board operates at 16 MHz.
- MCU memory columns - KB means 1024 bytes, MB means 1024^{2} bytes. The R7FA4M1AB MCU (Nano R4 board) contains data flash memory instead of EEPROM memory.
- MCU SRAM column - SRAM size doesn't include caches or peripheral buffers. ECC means SRAM has error correction code checking, Parity means SRAM has parity checking.
- MCU USART/UART column - USARTs are software configurable to be a: UART / SPI / other peripherals (varies across MCUs).
- MCU Other Bus Peripherals column - For USB bus, "FS" means Full Speed (12Mbps max), "HS" means High Speed (480Mbps max). For CAN bus, "A" means CAN 2.0A, "B" means CAN 2.0B, "FD" means CAN-FD. The RP2040 (Nano RP2040 Connect board) has a programmable I/O controller that can emulate various buses. Some buses require additional external circuitry to operate.
- MCU Timers column - The numbers in this column are the total number of each timer bit width, for example, the ATmega328P has one 16-bit timer and two 8-bit timers. "WD" means Watchdog timer, "RT" means Real Time Counter/Timer, "RC" means Real Time Clock (sec/min/hr). The 24-bit SysTick timer(s) inside the ARM cores aren't included in the 24-bit total in this column. PWM features are not documented in this table.

=== Gallery ===
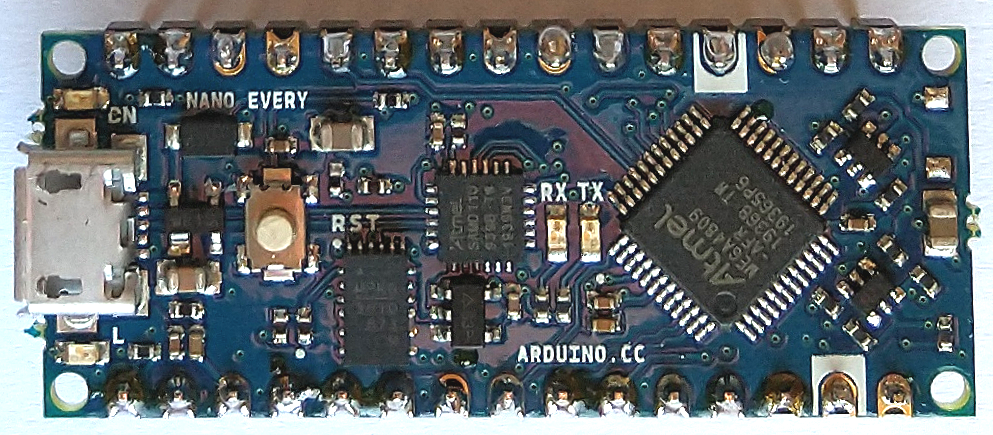
Arduino Nano Every board with ATmega4809 MCU

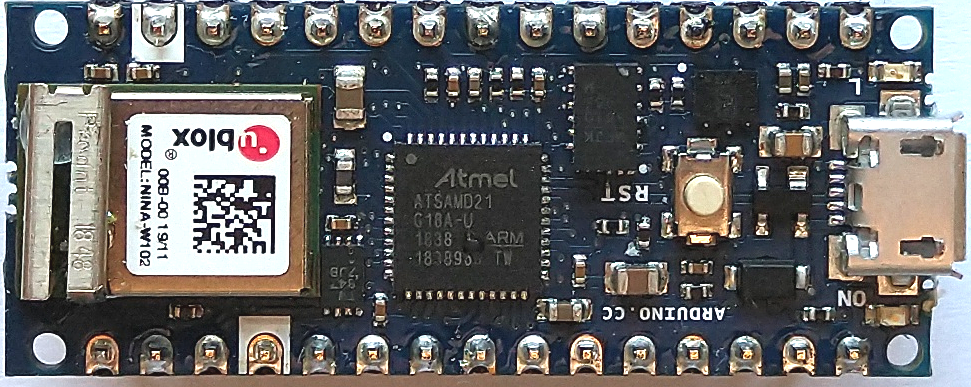
Arduino Nano 33 IoT board with ATSAMD21G18 MCU

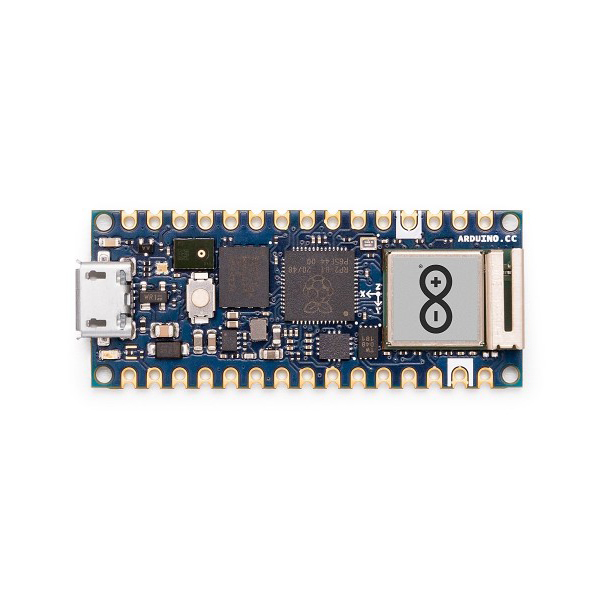
Nano RP2040 Connect board with RP2040 MCU

== See also ==
- AVR microcontrollers
- Atmel AVR instruction set
- In-system programming
