= ATmega88 =

8-bit microcontroller

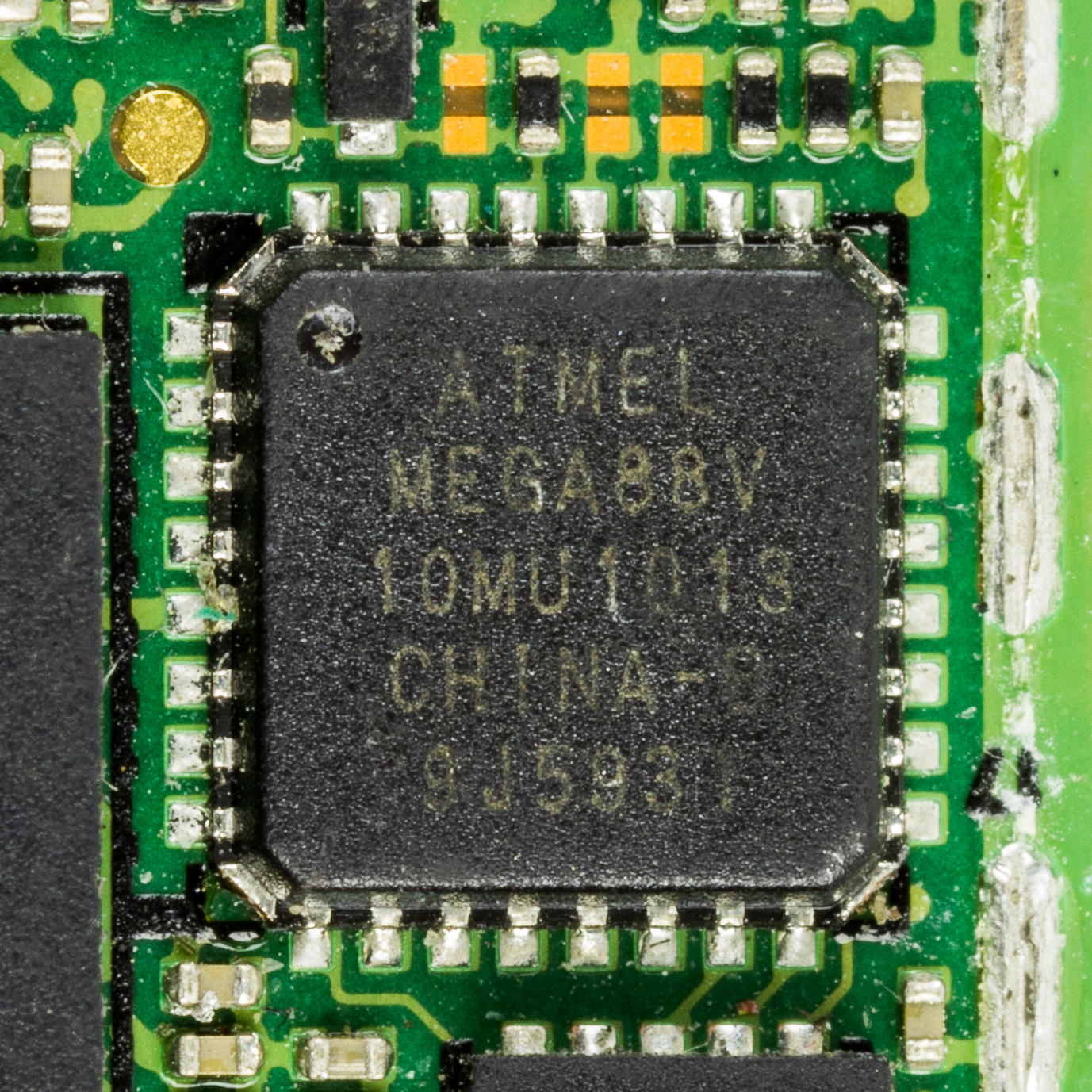
Atmel Mega88V with 8 KB Flash memory

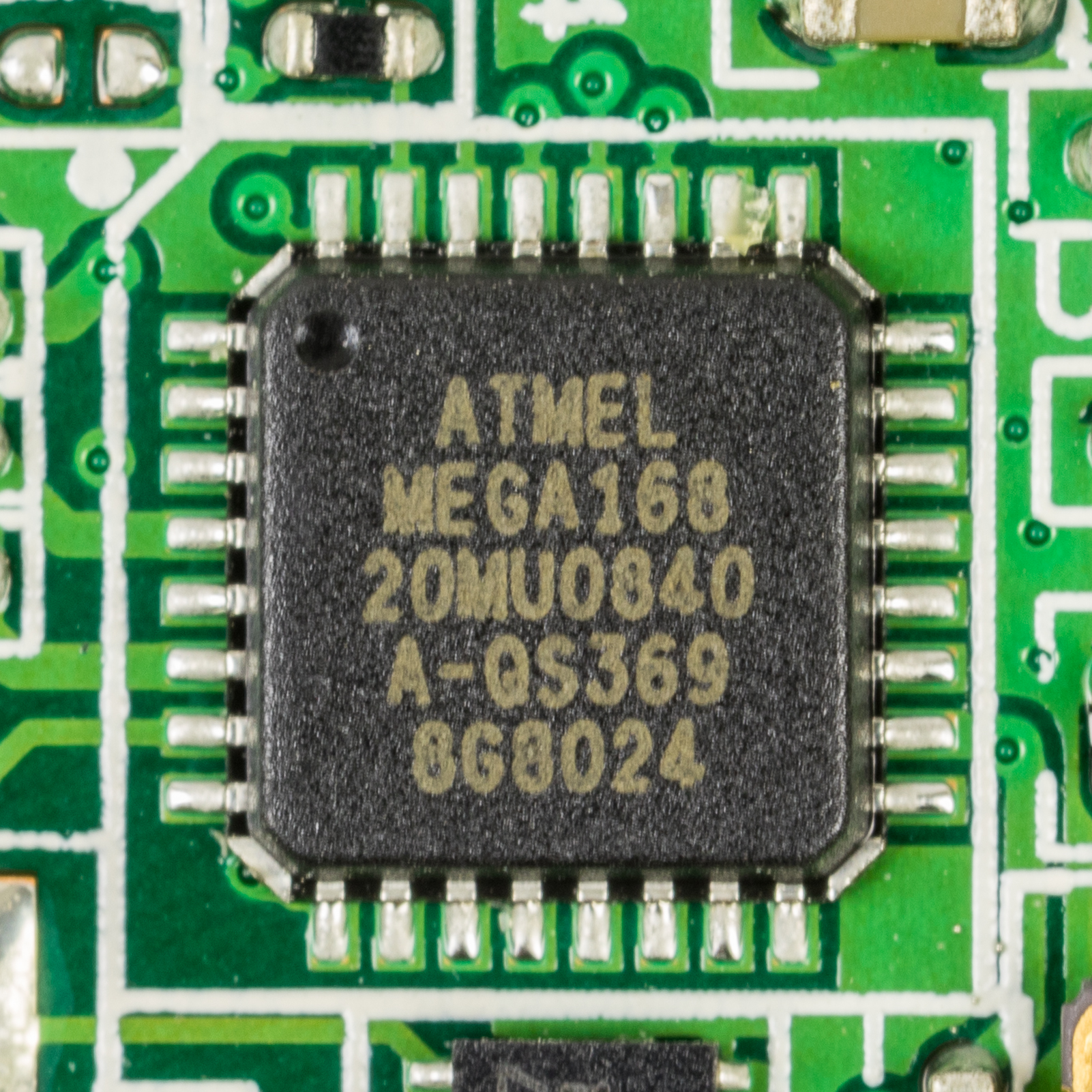
Variant ATmega168 with 16 KB Flash memory

The ATmega88 is an electronic integrated circuit microcontroller produced by the Atmel corporation. Atmel was acquired by Microchip Technology in 2016. It has the basic Atmel AVR instruction set. One of the packaging configurations is the dual in-line package (DIP). It has 23 I/O pins and operates at up to 20 MHz for clock speed. It has an 8-bit core and 8K flash (program) memory.

Many of Atmel's microcontrollers in this line have similar instruction sets, so if an engineer learns the instruction set from one of their microprocessors, this knowledge is transferable to other microcontrollers in the line.

The ATmega168 and ATmega48 are variants with less memory.

== Features ==
Parameter	ATmega48	ATmega88	ATmega168
CPU type	8-bit AVR		
Performance	20 MIPS at 20 MHz		
Flash memory	4 KB	8 KB	16 KB
SRAM	512 B	1 KB	1 KB
EEPROM	256 B	512 B	512 B
Pin count	28 or 32		
Maximum operating frequency	20 MHz		
Hardware QTouch Acquisition		No	20 MHz
Maximum I/O pins	23		
External interrupts	2	2	2
USB Interface	No	No	No
USB Speed	–	–	–

== See also ==
- ATmega328
- AVR microcontrollers
- Atmel AVR instruction set
- ATtiny microcontroller comparison chart
- In-system programming
