= Atmel =

American semiconductor manufacturer

Atmel Corporation
- Type: Subsidiary
- Traded as: Nasdaq: ATML
- Industry: Semiconductors
- Founded: 1984; 42 years ago
- Defunct: 2016
- Fate: Acquired by Microchip Technology
- Headquarters: San Jose, California, U.S.
- Products: Microcontrollers; Flash memory Touchscreen controllers Touch sensors Wireless/RF transceivers
- Revenue: ▼US$1.17B (FY 2015)
- Operating income: ▲US$136M (FY 2015)
- Net income: ▲US$26M (FY 2015)
- Total assets: ▼US$1.26B (FY 2015)
- Total equity: ▼US$876M (FY 2015)
- Number of employees: 4700
- Website: www.microchip.com

Atmel Corporation was a creator and manufacturer of semiconductors before being subsumed by Microchip Technology in 2016. Atmel was founded in 1984. The company focused on embedded systems built around microcontrollers. Its products included microcontrollers (8-bit AVR, 32-bit AVR, 32-bit ARM-based, automotive grade, and 8-bit Intel 8051 derivatives) radio-frequency (RF) devices including Wi-Fi, EEPROM, and flash memory devices, symmetric and asymmetric security chips, touch sensors and controllers, and application-specific products. Atmel supplies its devices as standard products, application-specific integrated circuits (ASICs), or application-specific standard product (ASSPs) depending on the requirements of its customers.

Atmel serves applications including consumer, communications, computer networking, industrial, medical, automotive, aerospace and military. It specializes in microcontroller and touch systems, especially for embedded systems.

Atmel's corporate headquarters is in San Jose, California, in the North San Jose Innovation District. Other locations include Trondheim, Norway; Colorado Springs, Colorado; Chennai, India; Shanghai, China; Taipei, Taiwan; Rousset, France; Nantes, France; Patras, Greece; Heilbronn, Germany; Munich, Germany; Whiteley, United Kingdom; Cairo, Egypt. Atmel makes much of its product line at vendor fabrication facilities. It owns a facility in Colorado Springs, Colorado that manufactures its XSense line of flexible touch sensors.

In 2016, Microchip agreed to buy Atmel for US$3.6 (equivalent to $4.83 in 2025) billion in a deal brokered by JPMorgan Chase and Qatalyst.

== History ==
Logo from 1984 to 2012

=== Founding and 1980s growth ===
Atmel Corporation was founded in 1984, by George Perlegos. Atmel was an acronym for "advanced technology for memory and logic". Perlegos had worked in the memory group of Intel in the 1970s and had co-founded Seeq Technology to manufacture EPROM memory. Using only US$30,000 in capital, Atmel was initially operated as a fabless company, using Sanyo and General Instrument to make the chip wafers. The first Atmel memory products used less power than competitors. Customers included Motorola, Nokia, and Ericsson. In 1987, Intel sued Atmel for patent infringement. Rather than fight the patent claim, Atmel redesigned its products to use different intellectual property. These had better performance and even lower power consumption. In addition, Atmel then entered the flash memory business that Intel had focused on. Atmel used US$60 million in venture capital for the 1989 purchase of a fabrication facility from Honeywell in Colorado Springs. Atmel then invested another US$30 million in manufacturing technology.

=== 1990s expansion ===
The first Atmel AVR prototype demo board

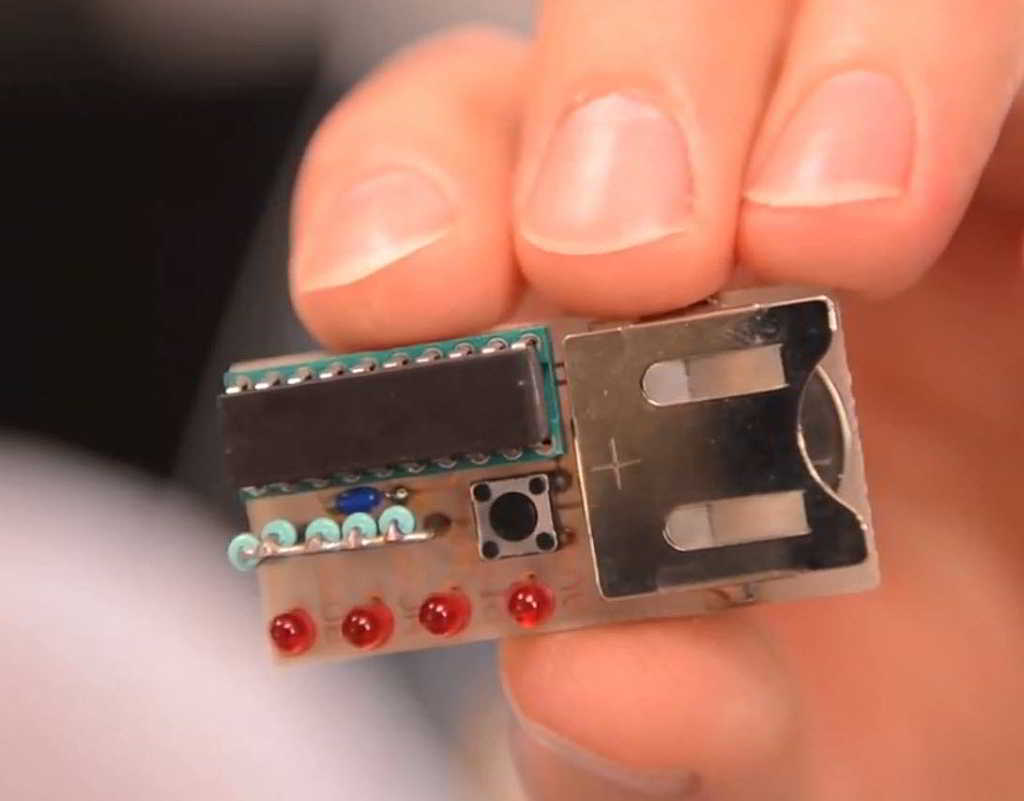
Front side

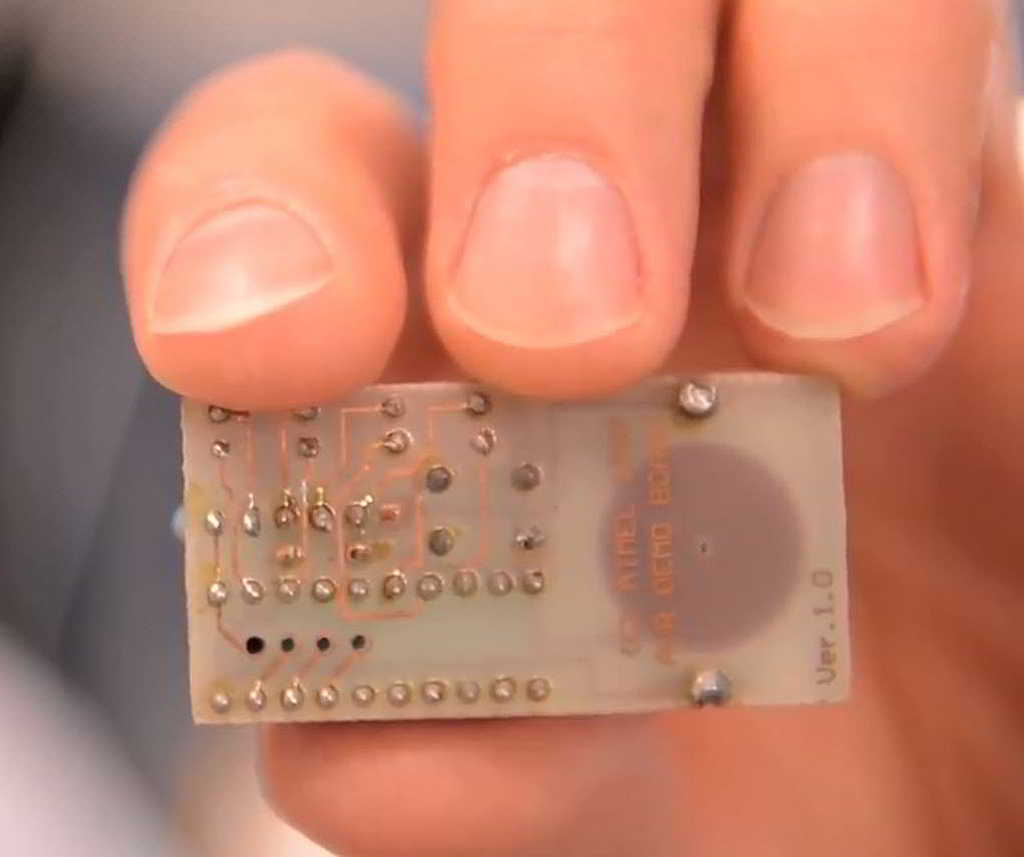
Back side

In 1991, Atmel expanded the Colorado facility after acquiring Concurrent Logic, a field-programmable gate array (FPGA) manufacturer. The company made its initial public offering (IPO) in 1991 which yielded more than US$65 million. 1994 saw Atmel enter the microprocessor market. The first Atmel flash memory microcontroller was based on the Intel 8051. The controller executed an instruction for every clock cycle, as opposed to the 12 cycles that legacy 8051 parts required. In 1994, Atmel purchased the EEPROM assets of Seeq Technology (LSI Corporation acquired the rest of Seeq in 1999). In 1995, Atmel was among the first companies to license the ARM architecture, creating its AT91 family of devices, followed by the SAM family, and more recently a full selection of Cortex-based solutions, including ones based on the ultra-low-power ARM Cortex-M4. Atmel now has dozens of families of ARM-based devices. In 1995, Atmel acquired the pan-European chipmaker European Silicon Structures (ES2) and thus gained a fabrication facility in Rousset, France. Atmel built a new fab alongside the existing ES2 fab. This business unit was named Atmel-ES2. Atmel acquired Digital Research in Electronic Acoustics and Music (DREAM) in 1996. Atmel formed a design team in Trondheim, Norway to develop the Atmel AVR line of RISC microcontrollers. This team combined technology of former students at the Norwegian University of Science and Technology with Atmel's expertise in flash memory. These 8-bit Harvard architecture chips were first developed in 1996. The AVR chip is the basis of most Arduino open-source development boards. In 1998, Atmel purchased part of TEMIC from Vishay Intertechnology, which provided it with a fab in Germany as well as part of MHS from Vishay that gave them a fab in Nantes, France.

In September 2000, Atmel acquired a fabrication plant in North Tyneside, England, from Siemens, via a £28 million grant from the UK government and paying Siemens around US$35 million.

=== Streamlining ===
Atmel streamlined operations with a strategy called "fab-lite". This started in 2005 when Atmel sold the MHS fab in Nantes France to Xbybus. In February 2006, Steven Laub became a director and in August president and chief executive officer. Under Laub Atmel divested more manufacturing plants and business lines. Atmel announced the sale of its North Tyneside facility (Fab9) on October 8, 2007. The manufacturing equipment was sold to Taiwan Semiconductor Manufacturing Company, Ltd. (TSMC) and the property and associated land to Highbridge Business Park Limited. In 2008, Atmel sold its fab in Germany to Tejas semiconductor. In 2010, Atmel received approval from the French government to sell its fab to Germany-based LFoundry GmbH, while retaining its design center there. Atmel completed the sale of its Secure Microcontroller Solutions smart card business to INSIDE Secure. In February 2011, Atmel sold its Digital Research in Electronics, Acoustics and Music (DREAM) business, which sold products for karaoke and other entertainment machines, for US$2.3 million. Atmel's DataFlash serial interface flash memory products were sold to Adesto Technologies in October 2012.

=== Acquisitions ===
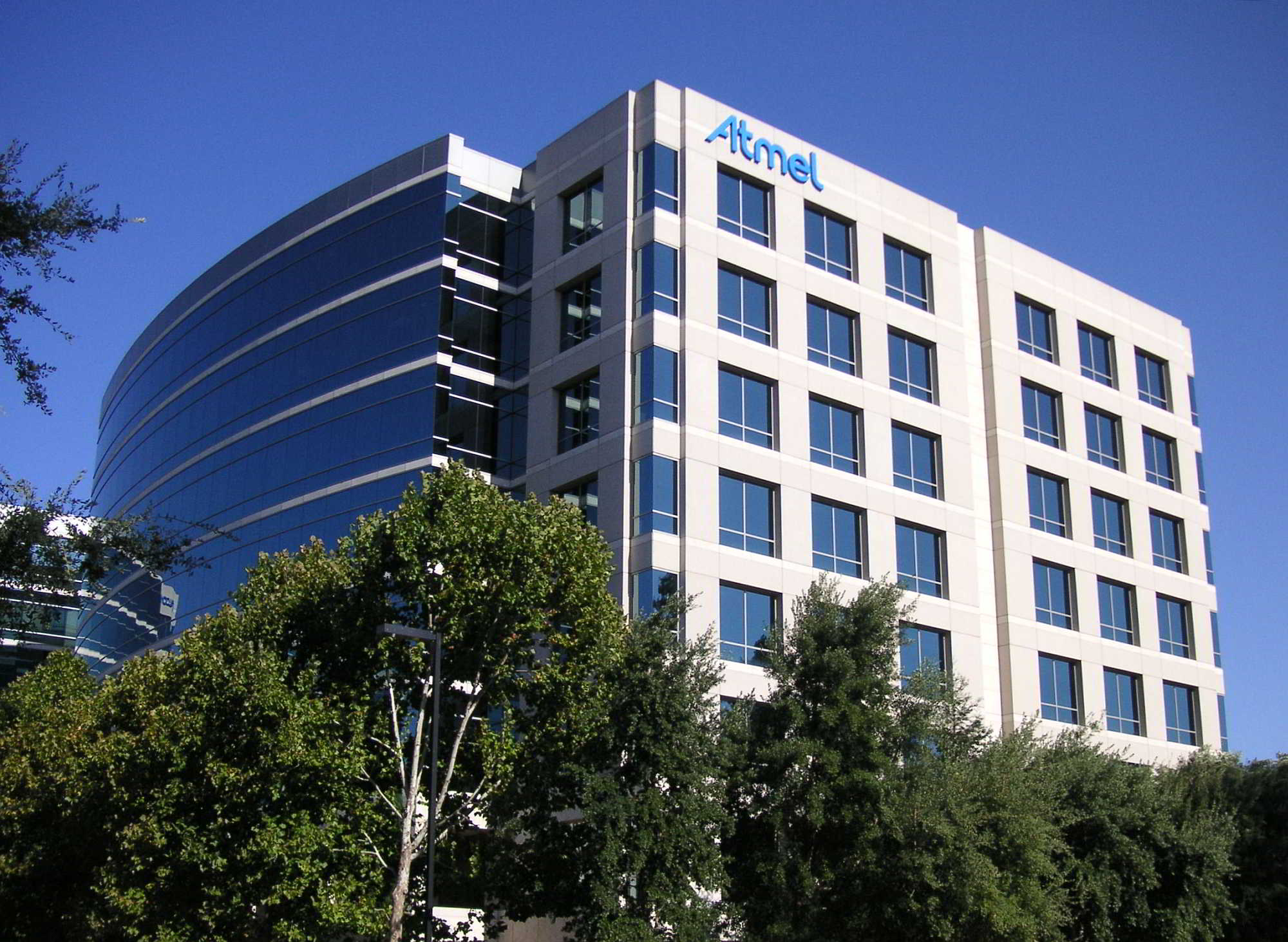
Atmel corporate headquarters in San Jose California

As Atmel divested several fabs and ancillary business lines, Laub also oversaw acquisitions. One strategy was to participate in the touch screen market, both in the semiconductor chips and the sensors themselves. In 2008, Atmel bought Queens Award-winning Quantum Research Group Ltd. (now known as Atmel Technologies Ireland Limited, a wholly owned subsidiary), a supplier of capacitive sensing technology. Work done at Quantum, led to the 2012 release of Atmel's XSense product line, a flexible touch screen based on copper mesh electrodes.

Atmel moved into Internet of things technology. They completed the acquisition of Advanced Digital Design S.A, a Spanish company that develops power line communication. Ozmo Devices, which developed products for Wi-Fi Direct, was acquired by Atmel in December 2012. Ozmo was founded in 2004 as H-Stream Wireless by Kateljin Vleugels and Roel Peeters, and was based in Palo Alto, California.

In 2012, Atmel had approximately US$1.4 billion in annual revenue, with over 60% of its revenue from microcontrollers, and net income of US$30 million.

Atmel purchased the smart metering product lines of IDT Corporation in March 2013.

Atmel purchased Newport Media in July 2014. This will provide Atmel further capability in wireless Bluetooth and Wi-Fi.

=== Acquisition by Microchip Technology ===
In October 2008, Atmel received an unsolicited offer from Microchip Technology and ON Semiconductor, estimated at US$2.3 billion. The offer was eventually rejected and the companies gave up on their hostile takeover attempt.

However, in 2016, Microchip agreed to buy Atmel for $3.6 billion. JPMorgan Chase and Qatalyst Partners served as financial advisers to Microchip and Atmel, respectively. The company had previously heard offers from Cypress Semiconductor and Dialog Semiconductor in 2015, and the deal with Microchip was expected to be finalized at the end of Q2 2016.

Atmel finally merged with Microchip Technology in July 2016 after prolonged negotiations for US$3.56 billion.

=== The end of Atmel Way ===
Apple Computer purchased the old cul-de-sac where Atmel's HQ office sat. Paperwork was filed with the city of San Jose to change the name from "Atmel Way" to "Orchard Place".

== Products ==
=== Microcontrollers ===
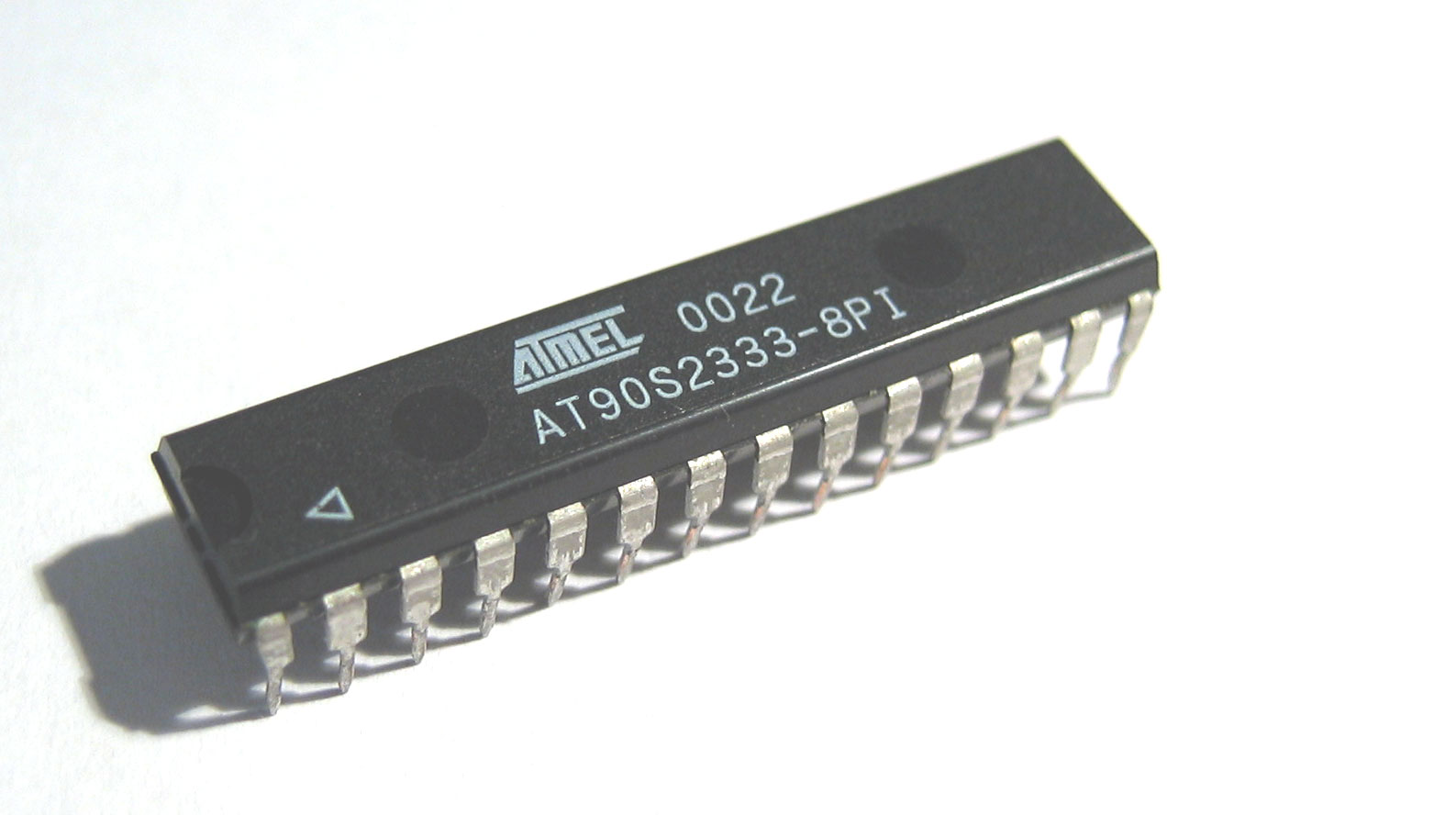
Atmel AT90S2333 microcontroller

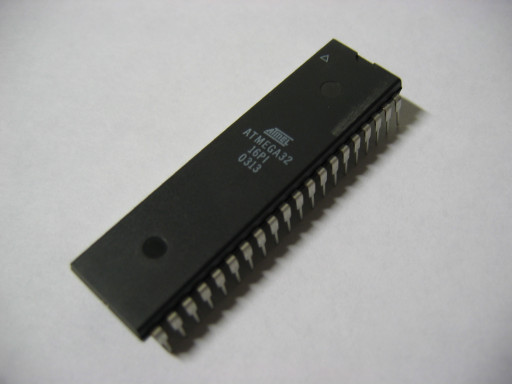
Atmel ATMEGA32 microcontroller

A large part of Atmel's revenue is from microcontrollers. These include the AVR 8- and 32-bit microcontrollers, ARM architecture microprocessors, and ARM-based flash microcontrollers. In addition Atmel still makes microcontrollers that use the 8051 architecture, albeit improved to do single-cycle instructions. Supporting the microcontrollers is the Atmel Studio 7 integrated development environment which Atmel offers for free. They also provide an Atmel Software Framework.

=== Wireless / RF ===
To provide for the Internet of Things (IoT), Atmel offers dual-band 2.4 GHz/5 GHz a/b/g Wi-Fi chips from its Ozmo acquisition. Also, Atmel offers 2.4 GHz b/g/n Wi-Fi chips WILC1000/WILC3000 and WINC1500 from its Newport Media, Inc acquisition. WINC1500 provide a full 802.11 b/g/n network controller with full ip stack TCP/IP, UDP with upper layer protocols as DHCP, DNS, HTTP, SNTP, TLS etc. Also, Atmel makes wireless transceivers using regional 700/800/900 MHz, as well as global 2.4 GHz frequency bands, Some chips are standalone transceivers while others are integrated with a microcontroller. They also sell the Zigbit module that comes with FCC certifications. Atmel also makes remote control RF products using the license-free ISM band (industrial scientific medical) frequencies (5.8 GHz, 2.4 GHz, 868 to 928 MHz, 433 MHz, and 315 MHz). The wireless segment also provides RFID chips for tracking, access and identification. Finally, Atmel offers a line of IR controllers that can support infrared as well as RF wireless.

=== Touchscreen ===
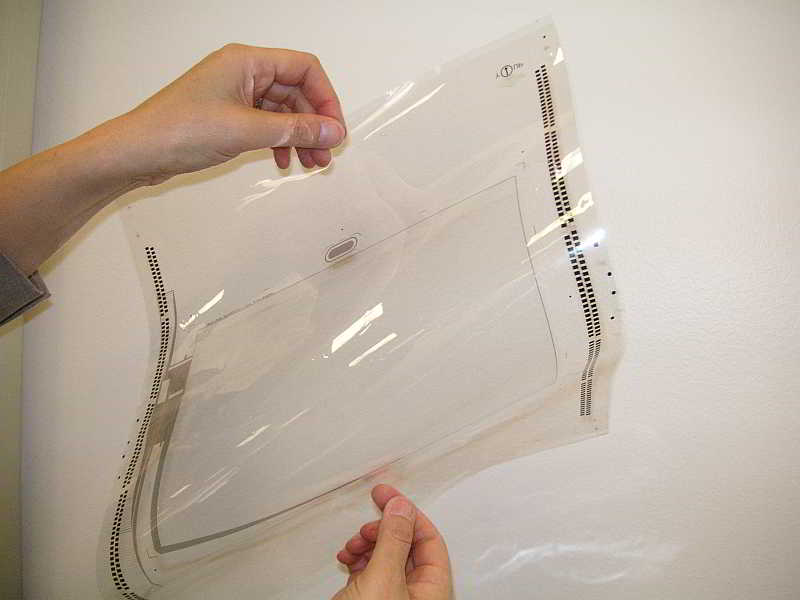
Atmel XSense is a flexible touchscreen film that uses a copper mesh instead of indium tin oxide (ITO).

Atmel makes both touchscreen controller ICs and its XSense flexible touchscreen. The company makes sensor hubs that manage accelerometers, gyroscopes, inertial measurement units and magnetometers. These sensors give consumer products and embedded systems context awareness. The sensor hub offloads the main application processor and allows product functionality without the need to power the main processor. Atmel also makes simple touch controller chips for buttons, sliders, and wheels used on industrial and consumer products. To support the application of its touch controller chips, Atmel provides a free QTouch library of software routines.

=== Memory ===
Atmel's original business was in memory, and it still sells several memory products. It offers serial and parallel EEPROM, as well as one-time programmable (OTP) EPROM. In addition, it offers secure memory with its CryptoMemory product line of EEPROMS in capacities from 1 to 256 kbits.

=== Security ===
In addition to the secure memory mentioned above, Atmel provides the CryptoAuthentication product lines that provide hardware authentication capability with both symmetric and asymmetric-key algorithm authentication. These ICs are used in many applications, including secure access, communications, control, and to prevent cloned products like batteries or ink cartridges not approved by the product manufacturer. Atmel's CryptoRF products add hardware encrypted security to RFID applications. Atmel offers a platform module that gives strong hardware-based public key (RSA algorithm) security for both personal computers and embedded processors on a single chip.

=== Analog ===
Atmel makes LED driver chips. It also has a line of digital-output temperature sensors. The company also makes power management and analog companions (PMAAC) that combine a group of discrete ICs often used in handheld or battery-powered products. Integrated functions include audio codecs (compressor-decompressor), lithium-ion battery chargers, and stereo digital-to-analog converters.

=== Custom ===
These products include custom integrated circuits designed to meet specialized single-customer requirements. Products include FPGAs, products with military and aerospace applications, and application-specific standard products (ASSP) for space applications, power management, and secure cryptographic memory products.

=== Automotive ===
Atmel modified or specialized many of its products for the automotive market. These products often have a wider temperature range or are specially qualified for automotive applications. These products include car access, touch control, radio, CAN, VAN, and LIN Bus networking, battery management, high-temperature drivers, and serial EEPROMs.

=== Smart energy ===
Atmel also has chips specialized for the smart energy and smart metering markets. These chips combine microprocessors with tamper-proof hardware security and power line communication modems. The parts also integrate analog front-ends for accurate metrology.

== See also ==
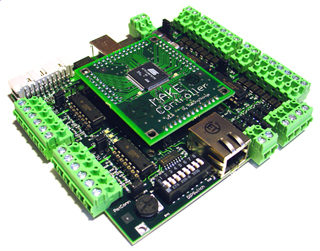
The Make Controller Kit with an Atmel AT91SAM7X256 (ARM) microcontroller

- Atmel AVR, a family of 8-bit microcontrollers
- Atmel ARM-based processors, a family of ARM-based microcontrollers
- AVR32, family of 32-bit microcontrollers
- AT91CAP, 32-bit ARM + gate array
- DataFlash, serial interface flash memory
- Arduino, open hardware single-board prototyping platform using an AVR microcontroller
- ATmega88, 8-bit microcontroller
- Atmel At94k see also AVR instruction set
- Atmel AT89 series, 8-bit microcontrollers, compatible with Intel 8051
