= List of Arduino boards and compatible systems =

This is a non-exhaustive list of Arduino boards and compatible systems. It lists boards in these categories:

- Released under the official Arduino name
- Arduino "shield" compatible
- Development-environment compatible
- Based on non-Atmel processors

Where different from the Arduino base feature set, compatibility, features, and licensing details are included.

== Official ==
Many versions of the official Arduino hardware have been commercially produced to date:

Name	Processor		Format		Host interface							I/O				Release date	Notes
	Processor	Frequency		Dimensions			Voltage	Flash (KB)	EEPROM (KB)	SRAM (KB)	Headers(Fem/Male) pins vs soldering	Digital I/O (pins)	Digital I/O with PWM (pins)	Analog input (pins)	Analog output pins		
Arduino Uno WiFi rev 2	ATMEGA4809, NINA-W132 Wi-Fi module from u-blox, ECC608 crypto device	16 MHz	Arduino / Genuino	68.6 mm × 53.4 mm [ 2.7 in × 2.1 in ]	USB-A	32U4	5 V	48	0.25	6	FH	14	5	6	0	AnnouncedMay 17, 2018	Contains six-axis accelerometer, gyroscope the NINA/esp32 module supports Wi-Fi and support Bluetooth as Beta feature
Arduino / Genuino MKR1000	ATSAMW25 (made of SAMD21 Cortex-M0+ 32 bit ARM MCU, WINC1500 2.4 GHz 802.11 b/g/n Wi-Fi, and ECC508 crypto device )	48 MHz	minimal	61.5 mm × 25 mm [ 2.4 in × 1.0 in ]	USB		3.3 V	256	No	32		8	12	7	1	Announced: April 2, 2016	
Arduino MKR WiFi 1010	ATSAMD21G18A (Arm® Cortex®-M0+)	48 MHz	minimal	61.5 mm × 25 mm [ 2.4 in × 1.0 in ]	USB		3.3 V	256	–	32		8	12	7	1	June 2018	u-blox NINA-W102 Wi-Fi/BLE module; Microchip ECC508 crypto chip
Arduino MKR Zero	ATSAMD21G18A	48 MHz	minimal	61.5 mm × 25 mm [ 2.4 in × 1.0 in ]	USB		3.3 V	256	No	32							
Arduino 101; Genuino 101	Intel Curie™ module two tiny cores, an x86 (Quark SE) and an ARC	32 MHz	Arduino / Genuino	68.6 mm × 53.4 mm [ 2.7 in × 2.1 in ]	USB		3.3 V	196		24		14	4	6		October 16, 2015	Contains six-axis accelerometer, gyroscope and Bluetooth
Arduino Zero	ATSAMD21G18A	48 MHz	Arduino	68.6 mm × 53.3 mm [ 2.7 in × 2.1 in ]	USB	Native & EDBG Debug	3.3 V	256	0 to 16 Kb emulation	32		14	12	6	1	Released June 15, 2015 Announced May 15, 2014; Listed on some vendors list Mar 2015	Beta test started in Aug 1, 2014, 32-bit architecture
Arduino Due	ATSAM3X8E (Cortex-M3)	84 MHz	Mega	101.6 mm × 53.3 mm [ 4 in × 2.1 in ]	USB	16U2 + native host	3.3 V	512	0	96		54	12	12	2	October 22, 2012	The first Arduino board based on an ARM processor. Features 2 channel 12-bit DAC, 84 MHz clock frequency, 32-bit architecture, 512 KB flash and 96 KB SRAM. Unlike most Arduino boards, it operates on 3.3 V and is not 5 V tolerant.
Arduino Yún	ATmega32U4, Atheros AR9331	16 MHz, 400 MHz	Arduino	68.6 mm × 53.3 mm [ 2.7 in × 2.1 in ]	USB		5 V	32 KB, 16 MB	1 KB, 0 KB	2.5 KB, 64 MB		14	6	12		September 10, 2013	Arduino Yún is the combination of a classic Arduino Leonardo (based on the ATmega32U4 processor) with a Wi-Fi system on a chip (SoC) running Linino, a MIPS Linux based on OpenWrt.
Arduino Leonardo	ATmega32U4	16 MHz	Arduino	68.6 mm × 53.3 mm [ 2.7 in × 2.1 in ]	USB	32U4	5 V	32	1	2.5		20	7	12		July 23, 2012	The Leonardo uses the ATmega32U4 processor, which has a USB controller built-in, eliminating one chip as compared to previous Arduinos.
Arduino Uno	ATmega328P	16 MHz	Arduino	68.6 mm × 53.3 mm [ 2.7 in × 2.1 in ]	USB-A	8U2 (Rev1&2)/ 16U2 (Rev3)	5 V	32	1	2	FM	14	6	6		September 24, 2010	This uses the same ATmega328 as late-model Duemilanove, but whereas the Duemilanove used an FTDI chip for USB, the Uno uses an ATmega16U2 (ATmega8U2 before rev3) programmed as a serial converter.
Arduino Mega2560	ATmega2560	16 MHz	Mega	101.6 mm × 53.3 mm [ 4 in × 2.1 in ]	USB	8U2 (Rev1&2)/ 16U2 (Rev3)	5 V	256	4	8	FH	54	15	16		September 24, 2010	Total memory of 256 KB. Uses the ATmega16U2 (ATmega8U2 before Rev3) USB chip. Most shields that were designed for the Duemilanove, Diecimila, or Uno will fit, but a few shields will not fit because of interference with the extra pins.
Arduino PORTENTA X8	PROCESSOR NXP® i.MX 8M Mini - 4x Arm® Cortex®-A53, 1x Arm® Cortex®-M4, STM32, Dual Arm® Cortex®-M7/M4 IC - 1x Arm® Cortex®-M7, 1x Arm® Cortex®-M4	480 MHz		101.6 mm × 53.3 mm [ 4 in × 2.1 in ]	USB-C High Speed	-	5 V	2GB	-	-	-	54	15	16		April 28, 2023	Host and Device operation; Power Delivery support CONNECTIVITY 1 Gbit Ethernet interface (PHY); Wi-Fi®; Bluetooth® Low Energy SECURITY NXP® SE050C2 Crypto on a separate secure bus DIMENSIONS 66,04 mm x 25,40 mm CERTIFICATIONS PSA from Arm®; Arm® SystemReady IR (multiple distributions) INTERFACES CAN; PCIe; SAI; MIPI; DSI; SPI; I2S; I2C; UART;
Arduino Ethernet	ATmega328	16 MHz	Arduino	68.6 mm × 53.3 mm [ 2.7 in × 2.1 in ]	Ethernet serial interface	Wiznet Ethernet	5 V	32	1	2		14	4	6		July 13, 2011	Based on the same WIZnet W5100 chip as the Arduino Ethernet Shield. A serial interface is provided for programming, but no USB interface. Late versions of this board support Power over Ethernet (PoE).
Arduino Fio	ATmega328P	8 MHz	minimal	66.0 mm × 27.9 mm [ 2.6 in × 1.1 in ]	XBee Serial		3.3 V	32	1	2		14	6	8		March 18, 2010	Includes XBee socket on bottom of board.
Arduino Nano	ATmega328 (ATmega168 before v3.0)	16 MHz	minimal	45 mm × 18 mm [ 1.8 in × 0.7 in ]	USB-mini	FTDI FT232R	5 V	16/32	0.5/1	1/2	MH & soldering	14	6	8		May 15, 2008	This small USB-powered version of the Arduino uses a surface-mounted processor.
LilyPad Arduino	ATmega168V or ATmega328V	8 MHz	wearable	51 mm ⌀ [ 2 in ⌀ ]			2.7-5.5 V	16	0.5	1		14	6	6		October 17, 2007	This minimalist design is for wearable applications.
Arduino Pro	ATmega168 or ATmega328	16 MHz	Arduino	53.3 mm × 52.1 mm [ 2.1 in × 2.05 in ]	UART serial, I²C (TWI), SPI	FTDI	5 V or 3.3 V	16/32	0.5/1	1/2		14	6	6		August 23, 2008	Designed and manufactured by SparkFun Electronics for use in semi-permanent installations.
Arduino Mega ADK	ATmega2560	16 MHz	Mega	101.6 mm × 53.3 mm [ 4 in × 2.1 in ]		8U2 MAX3421E; USB Host	5 V	256	4	8		54	14	16		July 13, 2011	
Arduino Esplora	ATmega32U4	16 MHz		165.1 mm × 61.0 mm [ 6.5 in × 2.4 in ]		32U4	5 V	32	1	2.5						December 10, 2012	Analog joystick, four buttons, several sensors, 2 TinkerKit inputs and 2 outputs, LCD connector
Arduino Micro	ATmega32U4	16 MHz	Mini	48.3 mm × 17.8 mm [ 1.9 in × 0.7 in ]	USB		5 V	32	1	2.5	Soldering	20	7	12		November 8, 2012	This Arduino was co-designed by Adafruit.
Arduino Pro Mini	ATmega328P	8 MHz (3.3V), 16 MHz (5V)	Mini	33.0 mm × 17.8 mm [ 1.3 in × 0.7 in ]	Six-pin serial header		5 V / 3.3 V	32	1	2	Soldering	14	6	6		August 23, 2008	Designed and manufactured by SparkFun Electronics.
UNO R4 Minima	Renesas RA4M1	48 MHz	Arduino	68.6 mm × 53.3 mm [ 2.7 in × 2.1 in ]	USB-C		5 V	256		32	FH	14	6	6			
UNO R4 WiFi	Renesas RA4M1	48 MHz	Arduino	68.6 mm × 53.3 mm [ 2.7 in × 2.1 in ]	USB-C		5 V	256		32	FH	14	6	6			Wifi Module: ESP32-S3-MINI-1-N8
Nano 33 BLE	ARM Cortex-M4	64 MHz		45 mm × 18 mm [ 1.8 in × 0.7 in ]	Micro USB		3.3 V	1 MB flash		256		14	All digital pins (4 at once)	8			
Nano 33 BLE Sense	ARM Cortex-M4	64 MHz		45 mm × 18 mm [ 1.8 in × 0.7 in ]	Micro USB		3.3 V	1 MB		256		14	14	8			
Nano RP2040 Connect	Raspberry Pi RP2040	133 MHz		45 mm × 18 mm [ 1.8 in × 0.7 in ]	Micro USB		3.3V	16MB		264		20	20 (Except A6, A7)	8			
Portenta H7	STM32H747 with ARM Cortex-M7	480 MHz		66 mm × 25.4 mm [ 2.6 in × 1.0 in ]		USB-C	3.3V	16 MB		8 MB SDRAM							
Uno Q	MCU: STM32U585 MPU: QRB2210	MCU: 160 MHz MPU: 2.0 GHz	Arduino	53.34 mm × 68.58 mm [ 2.1 in × 2.7 in ]	USB-C		3.3V	2 MB		786	FH	59 (12 from MPU, 47 from MCU)	6	6	2	October 7, 2025	The Arduino Uno Q differs from nearly all previous Arduino boards as it contains a Linux-compatible MPU as well as a microcontroller. It was the first Arduino board released after the Qualcomm aquisition.

=== Superseded ===
The following have been superseded by later and more capable versions from Arduino.

Name	Processor		Format		Host interface						I/O			Release date	Notes
	Processor	Frequency		Dimensions			Voltage	Flash (KB)	EEPROM (KB)	SRAM (KB)	Digital I/O (pins)	Digital I/O with PWM (pins)	Analog input (pins)		
Serial Arduino	ATmega8	16 MHz	Arduino	81.3 mm × 53.3 mm [ 3.2 in × 2.1 in ]	DE-9 serial connection	native								March 30, 2005	The first board labelled "Arduino".
Arduino USB	ATmega8	16 MHz	Arduino	81.3 mm × 53.3 mm [ 3.2 in × 2.1 in ]	USB	FTDI FT232BM									Arduino USB v2.0 Changed: USB replaces RS-232 interface, Improved: Arduino can be powered from host
Arduino Extreme	ATmega8	16 MHz	Arduino	81.3 mm × 53.3 mm [ 3.2 in × 2.1 in ]	USB										The Arduino Extreme uses many more surface mount components than previous USB Arduino boards and comes with female pin headers.
Arduino NG (Nuova Generazione)	ATmega8	16 MHz	Arduino	81.3 mm × 53.3 mm [ 3.2 in × 2.1 in ]	USB	FTDI FT232RL									Improved: FT232BM has been replaced by FT232RL to require fewer external components, LED on pin 13 added
Arduino NG plus	ATmega168	16 MHz	Arduino	81.3 mm × 53.3 mm [ 3.2 in × 2.1 in ]	USB										
Arduino BT (Bluetooth)	ATmega168; ATmega328	16 MHz	Arduino	81.3 mm × 53.3 mm [ 3.2 in × 2.1 in ]	Bluetooth	Bluegiga WT11 Bluetooth	5 V	32	1	2	14	4	6	October 22, 2007	Similar to the Arduino NG, this has a Bluetooth module rather than a serial interface. Programming is carried out via Bluetooth.
Arduino Diecimila	ATmega168 (DIP-28)	16 MHz	Arduino	68.6 mm × 53.3 mm [ 2.7 in × 2.1 in ]	USB	FTDI	5 V	16	0.5	1	14	6	6	October 22, 2007	Improved: Host is able to reset the Arduino, pin headers for reset and 3.3 V, low dropout voltage regulator allows lower voltage on external power source
Arduino Duemilanove (2009)	ATmega168, ATmega328P (ATmega328 for newer version)	16 MHz	Arduino	68.6 mm × 53.3 mm [ 2.7 in × 2.1 in ]	USB	FTDI	5 V	16/32	0.5/1	1/2	14	6	6	October 19, 2008	Improved: automatically switching between USB and external power, eliminating jumper
Arduino Mega	ATmega1280	16 MHz	Mega	101.6 mm × 53.3 mm [ 4 in × 2.1 in ]	USB	FTDI	5 V	128	4	8	54	14	16	March 26, 2009	Uses a surface-mounted ATmega1280 for additional I/O and memory.
Arduino Mini	ATmega168 (Pro uses ATmega328)	8 MHz (3.3 V model) or 16 MHz (5 V model)		17.8 mm × 33.0 mm [ 0.7 in × 1.3 in ]			5	16	0.5	1	14	6	6	August 23, 2008	This miniature version of the Arduino uses a surface-mounted processor.

== Compatible ==
Although the hardware and software designs are freely available under copyleft licenses, the developers have requested that the name "Arduino" be exclusive to the official product and not be used for derivative works without permission. The official policy document on the use of the Arduino name emphasizes that the project is open to incorporating work by others into the official product.

As a result of the protected naming conventions of the Arduino, a group of Arduino users forked the Arduino Diecimila, releasing an equivalent board called Freeduino. The name "Freeduino" is not trademarked and is free to use for any purpose.

Several Arduino-compatible products commercially released have avoided the "Arduino" name by using "-duino" name variants.

=== Footprint-compatible ===
The following boards are fully or almost fully compatible with both the Arduino hardware and software, including being able to accept "shield" daughterboards.

Name	Processor	Maker	Notes
Seeeduino V4.2	ATmega328P	Seeed Studio	Seeeduino V4.2 is an Arduino-compatible board, which is based on ATmega328P MCU, Arduino UNO bootloader, and with an ATmega16U2 as a UART-to-USB converter. The three on-board Grove interface can make your board connect to over 300 Grove modules.
Seeeduino Cortex-M0+]	SAMD21 Cortex-M0+	Seeed Studio	The Seeeduino Cortex-M0+ features an Atmel SAMD21 MCU which is based on a 32-bit ARM Cortex-M0+ processor. With the help of this powerful core, SAMD21 is much more powerful than AVR and can achieve many functions and more complex calculations that cannot be implemented on AVR chips.
Seeeduino Lotus V1.1	ATmega328P	Seeed Studio	Seeeduino Lotus V1.0 is a 2 in 1 solution of the Seeeduino board and base shield.
Seeeduino Lotus Cortex-M0+	SAMD21 Cortex-M0+	Seeed Studio	SMART™ SAM D21 is a series of low-power microcontrollers using the 32-bit ARM® Cortex®-M0+ processor with 256 KB flash and 32 KB of SRAM. The Seeeduino Lotus Cortex-M0+ can be considered as a combination of Seeeduino and Base Shield.
Seeeduino LoRaWAN	SAMD21 Cortex-M0+	Seeed Studio	LoRaWAN Class A/C Ultra long range communication Ultra low power consumption Arduino programming (based on Arduino Zero bootloader). Embedded with lithium battery management chip 4 Grove connectors onboard
Seeeduino LoRaWAN W/GPS	SAMD21 Cortex-M0+	Seeed Studio	LoRaWAN Class A/C Ultra long range of communication GPS communication Ultra low power consumption Arduino programming (based on Arduino Zero bootloader). Embedded with lithim battery management chip 4 Grove connectors onboard
Seeeduino Lite	ATmega32U4	Seeed Studio	Built around the ATmega32U4 chip Provide up to 20 Digital I/Os On board switch for 3. 3V and 5 V dual working mode 2 built-in Grove interface Built-in Micro USB for power supply and programming
Seeeduino Ethernet	ATmega328P	Seeed Studio	Seeeduino Ethernet is a compact and multifunctional development platform, which merges data logging and processing, device control and Ethernet communication together into one
Seeeduino Cloud	ATmega32U4	Seeed Studio	Built on Dragino Wi-Fi IoT module HE and ATmega32U4 Compatible with Arduino Yun Support 2.4 GHz Wi-Fi, 802.11 b/g/n Built-in Ethernet port and USB 2.0 Running OpenWrt system
Seeeduino Stalker V3.1	ATmega328P	Seeed Studio	Upgraded from Seeeduino Stalker V3.0 Lower power consumption (down to 100uA in sleep mode) Extra toggle switch for X-bee area 2 extra toggle switches for selecting the INT pin connected to RTC 3.3 V and 5 V dual mode
evive	ATmega2560	STEMpedia	Built on top of Arduino MEGA 2560 R3. Designed for STEM educational, and prototyping purpose. Compatible with Arduino Uno for all the Arduino Shields. Additional features: Internal Li-ion Battery, 2600 mAh. Charging via adapter or USB.; 5 V, output of up to 2 A, 3.3 V, 250 mA LDO voltage regulator; Variable Voltage supply of 1.25 V to 29 V, up to 2 A (Vin - 1 V); Reverse polarity and short circuit protection; 1.8" TFT display screen along with 5-way joystick and a pair of potentiometers, slide switch, and tactile.; Motor Drivers SN754410NE for 2 motors, and 2 dedicated Servo controllers pins; LED indicators for motors directions.; VESA mounting screws at bottom side. evive - arduino compatible board for STEM education
Canaduino Uno Bone	Atmega328P-PU	Universal Solder (universal-solder.com)	Do-it-yourself Arduino Uno R3 compatible footprint and connections. Additional features: 5 V, 1.5 A LDO voltage regulator with heat sink; 3.3 V, 250 mA LDO voltage regulator; 6 to 35 V DC power supply; LEDs and voltage regulator can be disabled to save on current; screw terminal block for power supply
ST1	ATmega328	Sanjay Technologies (sanjaytechnologies.co.in)	Compatible with Arduino Uno Rev3 - added features: Compatible with Arduino Uno R3.
ST Freeduino Robotics Board	ATmega328	Sanjay Technologies (sanjaytechnologies.co.in)	Compatible with Arduino with servo ports - added features: External DC power socket (7 VDC to 20 VDC) or USB powered. On-board 5 V regulator with heatsink area for efficient 1000 mA output. Has built in ICSP port for on the fly programming (P1). Robotics ready (has 4 servo ports P3 and P2).
GSTduino	ATmega328	Green System Technology	Added features: Powered via the micro USB connection, or 2.8–5.5 V battery connector Serial communication on pin D0 (RX) and pin D1 (TX). used to receive (RX) and transmit (TX) TTL serial data. These pins are connected to the corresponding pins of the FTDI USB-to-TTL serial chip. By sliding the switch (S1), RX/TX pins can be re-routed to Bluetooth UART connector.
Linduino One	ATmega328	Linear Technology Corporation	Compatible with Arduino Uno. Galvanically isolated USB interface provided by onboard LTM2884 USB Isolation module.
InVentor UNO	ATmega328P-PU	Ventor Technologies	Added features: Single sided with SMD and TH components; 5 V and 3.3 V LDO onboard; USB to serial PL2303 instead of Atmega16U2; 16 MHz crystal oscillator; Shield compatible; Auto power source selection circuit
InvIoT U1	ATmega328P-PU	InvIoT.com	inviot U1 (arduino-compatible) all-in-one board with LCD, rotary encoder, RTC DS3231, EEPROM, buzzer, push buttons, RGB Led, NRF24 plug, and ESP8266 plug. Added features: ATmega328P-PU with UNO bootloader; LCD 20x4 2004; Rotary encoder; 2x push buttons, RGB Led, power led; Buzzer; RTC clock DS3231; EEPROM; NRF24 plug; ESP8266 plug; SD card; Size 140 mm x 65 mm
Bluno	ATmega328	DFRobot.com	Added features: Built in TI CC2540; Bluetooth 4.0 ready
AVR.duino U+	ATmega328	SlicMicro.com	Compatible With Arduino Uno Rev3 Added features: SlicBus port (serial + power); Crystal oscillator (real time accuracy); On board test with button/LED/trimmer; A6 and A7 available
SainSmart UNO	ATmega328	SainSmart	Compatible with Arduino
SainSmart Mega 2560	ATmega2560	SainSmart	Compatible with Arduino
Freaduino MEGA2560	ATmega2560	ElecFreaks	Arduino Mega compatible; 3.3 or 5 V selectable; More efficient switching power supply with 7-23 V input; Mini-USB connector; Can source 2 A at 5 V and 800 mA at 3.3 V
SainSmart UNO R3	ATmega328-AU	SainSmart	Development board compatible with Arduino UNO R3 Controller: SMD MEGA328P-AU; A6/A7 port added; 3.3 V/5 V supply voltage and I/O voltage switch.
AVR-Duino		TavIR	Another Arduino/Mega compatible board.
Brasuíno		Holoscópio	Based on the Uno with rearranged LEDs and reset button, mini-USB connector, and altered pin 13 circuitry so that the LED and resistor do not interfere with pin function when acting as an input. The Brasuíno was designed using KiCad, and is licensed as GPLv2.
ChibiDuino2	ATmega328	TiisaiDipJp	Japanese Arduino compatible kit using Uno board setting. Includes two mini-B USB sockets, 1602 LCD socket, 5 V or 3.3 V power selection, breadboard area.
Cosmo Black Star	ATmega328	JT5	Arduino layout-compatible board. Based on the Arduino Duemilanove.
CraftDuino		Manufactured and sold by RoboCraft Team.	
CT UNO	ATmega328P	Cytron Technologies	CT-UNO features: Arduino Uno compatible.; SMD ATmega328 microcontroller with Optiboot (UNO) bootloader.; USB Programming Facilitated by the Ubiquitous FTDI FT231X (more stable).; TX, RX, power, pin 13 LEDs are moved to edge.; Utilize USB Micro-B socket.; Extra pads with standard 0.1” (2.54 mm) pitch to pitch.
CT ARM (Cytron ARM Cortex M0)	NUC131LD2AE (32-bit ARM Cortex-M0)	Cytron Technologies	CT-ARM features: Microcontroller: NUC131LD2AE (32-bit ARM Cortex-M0); Operating voltage: 5 VDC; Flash size (program memory): 64 KB; SRAM size: 8 KB; Digital I/O: 20 (16 PWM); Analog input (ADC): 6; UART: 5 + 1; Clock speed: 50 MHz; Compatible with Arduino IDE.
Diavolino		Evil Mad Scientist Laboratories	Arduino layout-compatible board, designed for use with a USB-TTL serial cable.
DuinoBot v1.x	ATmega32U4	RobotGroup Argentina	Arduino fully compatible board, with integrated power supply and controllers designed for robotics. Compatible as well with the system "Multiplo"
eJackino		Kit by CQ publisher in Japan.	Similar to Seeeduino, eJackino can use universal boards as shields. On back side, there is a "Akihabara station" silk, just like Italia on Arduino.
gizDuino Version 5.0V	Atmega168, Atmega328	e-gizmo	Arduino compatible USB to serial made by prolific Locally made in the Philippines.
Elektor Platino universal AVR board	ATmega8, ATmega16, ATmega32, ATmega88, ATmega164, ATmega168, ATmega324, ATmega328, ATmega644, ATmega1284	Elektor	Platino is an Arduino compatible board that supports 28-pin and 40-pin AVR devices. The board features multiple footprints for user interface elements like LCDs, pushbuttons, rotary encoders, LEDs and buzzer, supported by an extensive library. Bootloaders are available for all supported processors. On its backside are Arduino shield compatible connectors plus other extension connectors.
fayaduino Series	fayalab	Manufactured and sold by Taiwan-based kit company fayalab, with 100% compatible design to Genuino/Arduino.	
Freeduino MaxSerial		Manufactured and sold assembled or as a kit by Fundamental Logic until May 2010.	A board with a standard DE-9 serial port.
Freeduino SB	ATmega328	Solarbotics Ltd.	Compatible with the Duemilanove.
Freeduino Through-Hole		Manufactured and sold as a kit by NKC Electronics.	The design avoids surface-mount soldering.
Illuminato Genesis	ATmega644		Provides 64 KB of flash, 4 KB of RAM and 42 general I/O pins. Hardware and firmware are open source.
InduinoR3 (Previously Known as InduinoX)	ATmega168/ATmega 328/ATmega 8	Simple Labs	A low cost Arduino clone using the ATmega168/ATmega 328/ATmega 8 and designed for prototyping, it includes onboard peripherals such as an RGB LED, switches, IR LED, TSOP and LDR.
Japanino	ATmega168	A kit by Otonano Kagaku publisher in Japan.	The board and a POV kit were included in Vol. 27 of the eponymous series. It is unique in having a regular size USB A connector.
1000Pads Luigino			Minimalistic version of Arduino: small, without serial converter. Available as a kit, board only or assembled. Smaller than Arduino, with different footprint.
Luigino328	ATmega328		It has an improved automatic voltage selector, resolves problems during programming caused by shields that use the serial port, with an automatic serial port selector, and has the LM1117 voltage regulator.
metaboard		Developed by Metalab, a hackerspace in Vienna.	Designed to have a very low complexity and price. Hardware and firmware are open source.
Rascal	AT91SAM9G20 (ARM9)	Rascal Micro	It is compatible with Arduino shields, but it is programmed in Python rather than C++. It has an embedded webserver.
Raspduino	ATmega328	Bitwizard	Fully Arduino compatible board, that fits perfectly on a Raspberry Pi, and can be programmed through the Raspberry Pi's serial interface. It also breaks out the Raspberry Pi's SPI and I²C interfaces, or can be used as a stand-alone Arduino when powered with the external power header.
Romeo 2012	ATmega328	DFRobot	An all-in-one Arduino with motor controller. Compatible with the Arduino Uno.
Roboduino			Designed for robotics. All connections have neighboring power buses (not pictured) for servos and sensors. Additional headers for power and serial communication are provided. It was developed by Curious Inventor, LLC.
SunDuino	ATmega8/88/168/328/16/32/324/644 and PIC18F2550/4550 PIC32MX320F128 and ButterFLY, STM32Discovery	Lothar Team Arduino PRO Compatible boards. (Poland)	Another Arduino compatible board, software- and hardware-compatible.
TwentyTen		Freetronics	Based on the Duemilanove, with a prototyping area, rearranged LEDs, mini-USB connector, and altered pin 13 circuitry so LED and resistor do not interfere with pin function when acting as an input.
UDOO	Atmel SAM3X8E	SECO Inc.	Android-Linux-Arduino compatible board.
Volksduino		Applied Platonics	A low cost, high power, shield-compatible, complete Arduino-compatible board kit. Based on the Duemilanove, it comes with a 5 V / 1 A voltage regulator (optional 3.3 V regulator). Designed for low component count and for ease of assembly.
Wiseduino			Includes a DS1307 RTC with backup battery, a 24LC256 EEPROM and a connector for XBee adapter for wireless communication.
Xaduino	ATXmega128A3U	OBDIIworld	8/16 bit Xmega core @ 32 MHz. 8 KB SRAM. 37 Digital I/O. 3.3 V. 2 DAC. Output 3.3 V pin: 500 mA, 5 V 500 mA.
YourDuinoRoboRED	Atmel 328	Yourduino.com	Includes 14 color-coded 3-pin connectors for direct cable connection of servos, electronic bricks, etc., and six color-coded3-pin connectors to analog inputs for electronic bricks, etc. Provides improved 3.3 V regulator supplying 500 mA, and optional 3.3 V operation. Switching regulator provides 5 V 2 A from up to 20 V external supply.
YourDuinoRobo1	Atmel 328	Yourduino.com	Includes 6 color-coded 3-pin connectors for direct cable connection of servos, electronic bricks, etc., and 6 3-pin connectors to analog inputs for electronic bricks, etc. Provides improved 3.3 V regulator supplying 500 mA, and optional 3.3 V operation.
ZArdino	ATMega328	A kit created by Peter Ing	A South African Arduino-compatible board derived from the Duemilanove, it features mostly through-hole construction except for the SMD FT232RL IC, power selection switches, option for a Phoenix power connector instead of DC jack, extra I/O pads for using Veroboard as shields. Designed for easy assembly in countries where exotic components are hard to find. PCB layout and board now available on Circuitmaker as Open Source Hardware
Zigduino	ATmega128RFA1	Logos Electromechanical	Integrates Zigbee (IEEE 802.15.4). It can be used with other 802.15.4 network standards as well as Zigbee. It is the same shape as the Duemilanove, includes an external RPSMA jack on the side of the board opposite the power jack, and is compatible with shields that work with other 3.3 V boards.
EtherTen	ATmega328P	Freetronics	Fixed SPI behaviour on Ethernet chip, D13 pin isolated with a MOSFET of which can also be used as an input.
EtherMega	ATmega2560	Freetronics	Fixed SPI behaviour on Ethernet chip, Micro SD card slot, D13 pin isolated with a MOSFET of which can also be used as an input.
USBDroid	ATmega328P	Freetronics	Can act as a host for an Android device and is compatible with the Android Open Accessory Development Kit, Micro SD card slot, D13 pin isolated with a MOSFET of which can also be used as an input.
Eleven	ATmega328P	Freetronics	Arduino Uno compatible, D13 pin isolated with a MOSFET of which can also be used as an input.
KitTen	ATmega328P	Freetronics	Includes both 3.3 V and 5 V regulators for shields, D13 pin isolated with a MOSFET of which can also be used as an input. Can be connect to Arduino using CAT5 cable.
EtherDue	ATSAM3X8E (Cortex-M3)	Freetronics	Arduino Due with onboard Ethernet, software-compatible with Arduino Ethernet shield, D13 pin isolated with a MOSFET of which can also be used as an input.
TAIJIUINO Due Pro	ATSAM3X8E (Cortex-M3)	Elechouse	Mostly compatible with Arduino Due. Includes RMII signals via a connector to allow access to the microcontroller's native Ethernet MAC.
ShieldBuddy TC275	Infineon Aurix TC275TP	Hitex UK	Uses Arduino Due form factor and largely compatible pin allocation. Runs at 5 V, but can be modified to run at 3.3 V. Triple-core, 32-bit, 200 MHz Aurix processor. 4 MB flash, 550 kB SRAM, 128 kB DataFlash. Optional CIC61508 safety monitor. Arduino IDE supported via add-in, plus Eclipse-based tools with multicore debugger.
MBZ Pro WiFi	Atmega328P-PU	MaxBlitz	MBZ Pro Mega is an Arduino compatible stand-alone board with a prototyping area and built-in Wi-Fi. Featuring a compact design, it helps to shrink Arduino projects and make it permanent.: Dimensions 3.56" x 2.24" (90.5 mm x 56.9 mm); Compatible with Arduino Shields; Prototyping area to solder components and modules; 2 voltage regulators: 5 V-1 A and 3.3 V-800 mA; I²C bus header, compatible with RTC breakouts modules such as DS1307 and DS3231; Internet connection via ESP8266 module (model ESP-01); Integrated 5 V to 3.3 V level shifter (IC 74HC4050); Digital ports D3, D4, D9, D10, D11 and D13 are available both in 5 V and 3.3 V; Header for FTDI USB to serial adapter to upload the sketches.
Rhino Mega 2560	ATmega2560	Cyrola Inc.	Arduino Uno compatible board powered by ATmega2560. D0/D1 can be changed to D19/D18. It enables to multiple serial communication. A4/A5 are not connected to SDA/SCL same as Arduino Mega.
Mega 2560 PRO (Embed)	ATmega2560-16AU	RobotDyn	Embed version of Mega 2560 CH340G/ATmega2560 - compatible with Arduino Mega 2560 board. Built on the Atmel ATmega2560 microcontroller and USB-UART interface chip CH340G. Board have compact size 38x55 mm. It is good solution, to make your final project on solder proto-board. Board for functionality similar to the Arduino Mega 2560. It is embed board, but the same stable, and uses the original chips ATmega2560 (16 MHz). The board used the chip CH340G as converter UART-USB. When working in the frequency 12 MHz, giving a stable result of data exchange (need install drivers to computer). Mega PRO (Embed) 2560 CH340G / ATmega2560 - connects to the computer via microUSB cable (used for almost all Android smartphones).
MiniZed	Zynq 7Z007S	Avnet, Inc.	Compatible with Arduino shields and Pmod extension cards. ARM Cortex-A9 CPU (max frequency 667 MHz) and FPGA fabric, 512 Mb RAM, 8 Gb eMMC storage, on-board Wi-Fi and Bluetooth, USB 2.0 host.

=== Special purpose compatible ===
Special purpose Arduino-compatible boards add additional hardware optimised for a specific application. It is kind of like having an Arduino and a shield on a single board. Some are Shield compatible, others are not.

Name	Processor	Shield-compatible?	Host interface	Maker	Additions
Io:duino	AT90CAN128	yes	USB with FTDI serial chip	Railstars	Adds built-in CAN support through the AT90CAN128 micro processor, dual RJ45 jacks, and optional bus termination. Designed specifically for model railroading applications using the OpenLCB networking protocol, the hardware is sufficiently generic for use with other low-speed CAN networks. OUT OF BUSINESS 17 Dec 2014. All designs supposedly on GitHub, but Io:duino is not present. (https://web.archive.org/web/20160516101800/http://railstars.com/blog/)
DFRobotShop Rover	ATmega328				This is a minimalist tracked platform based on the Arduino Duemilanove. Has an ATmega328 with Arduino bootloader, a dual H-bridge and additional prototyping space and headers. It is compatible with many shields, though four digital pins are used when operating the motor controller. Has an onboard voltage regulator, additional LEDs, a temperature sensor, and a light sensor. Part of the DFRobotShop Rover kit.
Faraduino	ATmega328	Yes	USB with FTDI serial chip	Developed by Middlesex University Teaching Resources.	Simple shield-compatible board, with onboard discrete transistor H-bridges and screw terminals to drive two small DC motors from pins 4–7. Has headers for three servos on pins 9–11. Also sold with the Faraduino buggy kit and Faraconnect shield as a simple school-level teaching robot.
Motoruino	ATmega328	Yes	Serial only, 6-pin header	Guibot	Has L293D twin H-bridge.
Alternator Regulator	ATmega64M1	No	USB with FTDI serial chip		Open source Alternator Regulator suitable for 12 V to 48 V systems with many different battery chemistries (lead-acid, LiFeP04, etc.). Multi stage (3, 4), fully configurable. Features battery voltage and current measurement to assure complete and safe battery charging as well as CAN support for communications with other devices and status output (including "NMEA2000" like messages). Programmable using Arduino IDE with ATmegaxxM1 board type ( https://github.com/thomasonw/ATmegaxxM1-C1 ) More (including source and CAD files): https://arduinoalternatorregulator.blogspot.com/
ArduPilot					An Arduino-compatible board designed for auto-piloting and autonomous navigation of aircraft, cars, and boats. It uses GPS for navigation and thermopile sensors or an IMU for stabilization.
ArduIMU					An Arduino-compatible board designed for inertial measurement and inertial navigation of aircraft, cars, and boats. It uses the ATmega128RFA1 and a variety of sensors IMU for various applications.
FlyDuino Mega	ATmega 2560		Serial only, 6-pin header	Paul Bake	An Arduino Mega 2560 compatible board designed for auto-piloting and autonomous navigation of multirotor aircraft. Designed to be stacked with sensor bobs and boards with several breakout boards available.
Colibri	ATmega168	No	Serial only	JT5	Universal platform for wireless data transmission in the frequency band 868 MHz. The board combines features of Arduino Mini and the radio EZRadioPRO for receiving and transmitting data. With DataFlash.
JeeNode	ATmega328		6-pin header	Jeelabs	Includes a wireless radio module, called the RFM12B by HopeRF
ArduPhone	ATmega1284P	yes	USB	Freetronics	Cellular phone kit, ADH8066 GSM module, Micro SD slot, 16 key matrix keyboard, LiPo charger and microphone/speaker connectors.
WTFDUINO	ATmega328P	No	USB & CH340G	Calum Knott	"The world needs a more confusing Arduino"
Tah	ATmega32U4	Yes	USB	Revealing Hour Creations	Stock Arduino Leonardo with a built-in BLE (Bluetooth Low Energy) 4.0. Has Arduino compatibility with its breakout shield.
WIOT	ATmega32U4	No	USB	ubld.it	WIOT is an Open Source, rechargeable, Li-ion battery powered, Arduino compatible, development board designed around the ATmega32U4 processor and ESP8266 Wi-Fi Module.
XLR8	Altera MAX10 10M08 FPGA	Yes, with exceptions	USB	Alorium Technology	FPGA-based drop-in replacement for Arduino UNO R3; offers faster clock rates and overall applications speed, higher-performance through vendor-supplied hardware-specific library functions utilizing FPGA; half of FPGA's space remains available for further customizations including ones written by end user
Arduino Uno*Pro	ATmega1284	No	USB	Hobbytronics	Replaces the Arduino Uno's ATmega328 chip with the ATmega1284, drastically expanding memory.

=== Industrial grade ===
Name	Model	Processor	Voltage	Host interface	I/O	Maker	Additions
Controllino	Mini	ATmega328	12 V or 24 V	USB	8x analog/digital inputs, 6x relay outputs, 8x digital outputs	Controllino / Conelcom GmbH	Once successful Kickstarter project, CONTROLLINO is now used by over 800 companies in the industry automation, automotive and aerospace field. CONTROLLINO Mini.
Controllino	Maxi	ATmega2560	12 V or 24 V	Ethernet/USB	12x analog/digital inputs, 10x relay outputs, 12x digital outputs	Controllino / Conelcom GmbH	Once successful Kickstarter project, CONTROLLINO is now used by over 800 companies in the industry automation, automotive and aerospace field. CONTROLLINO Mini.
Controllino	Mega	ATmega2560	12 V or 24 V	Ethernet/USB	12x analog/digital inputs, 10x relay outputs, 12x digital outputs	Controllino / Conelcom GmbH	Once successful Kickstarter project, CONTROLLINO is now used by over 800 companies in the industry automation, automotive and aerospace field. CONTROLLINO Mini.
FA-DUINO	12RA	Mega2560	24 V	RS-232	8x inputs, 4x relays	Comfile Technology	
FA-DUINO	24RA	Mega2560	24 V	RS-232	16x inputs, 8x relays	Comfile Technology	
ARDBOX		ATmega32U4	12-24 V	USB	10x inputs, 10x outputs	Industrial Shields	Uses Arduino Leonardo board
Industruino		Atmega 32u4 or Atmega AT90USB1286	6.5-32 V	USB	8x shared digital input/output, 4x analog inputs, 2x analog outputs	Industruino	Arduino compatible industrial controller housed in DIN rail casing, designed for industrial automation in small to medium-sized businesses.
Iono		No integral board	11–30 V	USB / 6-pin header	6x inputs, 6x outputs	Sfera Labs	iono is a general-purpose industrial controller based on Arduino, suitable for professional use (e.g. industrial automation, building automation). It features wide-range power supply, analog/digital inputs with robust protection circuits, power relays with double-winding latching bistable coils, 0÷10 V analog output, DIN rail case.
Opta		STM32H747XI dual-core Arm Cortex-M7 +M4 MCU	24 V DC	Lite: Ethernet, USB-C RS485: RS485 half duplex WiFi: WiFi+Bluetooth low energy		Finder / Arduino	micro PLC with Industrial IoT capabilities, supporting Arduino programming experience and PLC IEC 61131-3 standard languages (Ladder, Functional Block Diagram, Structured Text, Sequential Function Chart or Instruction List)
Portenta Machine Control		Arm Cortex-M7 core at up to 480 MHz + Arm 32-bit Cortex-M4 core at up to 240 MHz	24 V DC	Ethernet, USB, Programming Port, Wi-Fi, Bluetooth LE			Industrial IoT capabilities for standalone industrial machinery

=== Software-compatibility only ===
These boards are compatible with the Arduino software, but they do not accept standard shields. They have different connectors for power and I/O, such as a series of pins on the underside of the board for use with breadboards for prototyping, or more specific connectors. One of the important choices made by Arduino-compatible board designers is whether or not to include USB circuitry in the board. For many Arduino tasks, the USB circuitry is redundant once the device has been programmed, so that circuitry can be placed in the cable between development PC and board, thus making each instance of the board less expensive, potentially smaller, and more power efficient.

Name	Processor	Maker	Notes
Seeeduino XIAO	SAMD21G18 Cortex-M0+	Seeed Studio	Seeeduino XIAO is the smallest Arduino compatible board in Seeeduino Family. It is an Arduino microcontroller that is embedded with the SAMD21 microchip. The interfaces of Seeeduino XIAO is rich enough in such a tiny Dev. Board as well.
Seeeduino Nano	ATmega328P	Seeed Studio	The Seeeduino Nano is a compact board similar to the Seeeduino V4.2/Arduino UNO, and it is fully compatible with Arduino Nano on pinout and sizes.
Seeeduino Mega	ATmega2560	Seeed Studio	Built around ATmega 2560 @ 16 MHz Massive GPIOs: 70 digital I/Os, 16 analog inputs and 4 UARTs, etc. Small form factor, 30% smaller than Arduino Mega 3.3 V and 5 V dual mode. Can be powered through a battery or through an AC to DC adaptor
Ardweeny		Solarbotics	An inexpensive, even more compact breadboardable device.
Banguino	ATmega328	Dimitech	Enhanced Arduino-Uno-compatible in standard PLCC68 socket
Nano DIP	ATtiny3217	Nano DIP avdweb	The Smallest Arduino-Compatible ATtiny3217 Board: Digital I/O pins: 22; PWM outputs: 5; Analog inputs: 12
SAM15x15	SAMD21G18	SAM15x15 avdweb	SAM 15x15mm Arduino Zero compatible SAMD21 board: Digital I/O pins: 34; PWM outputs: 24; Analog inputs: 14
Canique MK2	ATmega328P	Canique	A very power efficient breadboard friendly Arduino compatible board with onboard RFM69W/RFM69HW transceiver and a stock speed of 16 MHz @ 3.3 V. You can solder your own antenna or connect an antenna via U.FL connector.
Bare Bones Board (BBB) and Really Bare Bones Board (RBBB)		Modern Device	Compact inexpensive Arduino-compatible board suitable for breadboarding.
BBFUINO (Breadboard Friendly Arduino Compatible)	ATmega328P	Cytron Technologies	BBFuino come with the ATmega328 controller, loaded with Optiboot (Arduino UNO's bootloader), compatible with Arduino IDE and sample code, design to fit breadboard for prototyping and learning, lower down the cost by taking out the USB to UART IC, so the board has the basic component to operate.
BlockDuino	ATmega8 ATmega328	Blockduino	An Arduino-Diecimila-compatible board with serial connection to Blocks (shields).
Boarduino	ATmega168 or ATmega328	Adafruit	An inexpensive Arduino-Diecimila-compatible board made for breadboarding.
Breaduino		Applied Platonics	A complete, very low cost Arduino-compatible kit that can be assembled entirely on a breadboard.
Dasduino series	ATmega328, ESP32, ESP8266, STM32	Soldered Electronics	Inexpensive series of fully compatible Arduino boards for education and hobbyists, designed and manufactured in Croatia.
Cardboarduino	ATmega168		Inspired by the Paperduino, an ultra low-cost Arduino compatible, built on printed posterboard, rather than a PCB.
Crumbuino-Nano	ATmega328	chip45.com/	The Crumbuino-Nano is a low-cost module comparable to the Arduino-Nano and can be used as Arduino-Nano in the Arduino-IDE. The Arduino bootloader is preloaded, hence the module is ready-to-use. The documentation shows the pin mapping of Arduino-naming to module pinout.
Crumbuino-Mega	ATmega2560	chip45.com/	The Crumbuino-Mega is a low-cost module comparable to the Arduino-Mega 2560 and can be used as Arduino-Mega 2560 in the Arduino-IDE. The Arduino bootloader is preloaded, hence the module is ready-to-use. The documentation shows the pin mapping of Arduino-naming to module pinout.
Cuteduino	ATtiny85	Cytron Technologies	Cuteduino Features: ATtiny85 on board, 8 KB of flash, 512 byte of SRAM, 512 bytes of EEPROM.; Internal oscillator runs at 16 MHz.; USB bootloader so you can program it with the modified version Arduino IDE (from DigiSpark).; Micro-B USB jack for power and/or USB uploading.; 5 GPIO - 2 shared with the USB interface. The 3 independent I/O pins have 1 analog input (ADC) and 2 PWM output as well.; Hardware I²C / SPI capability for breakout & sensor interfacing.; Works with many basic Arduino libraries including RainbowBit library.
Digispark	ATtiny85	Digistump	Digispark Built-in USB plug. Requires special version of the Arduino IDE.
DragonFly	ATmega1280		A compact board with Molex connectors, aimed at environments where vibration could be an issue. DragonFly features the ATmega1280 and have all 86 I/O lines pinned out to connectors.
Femtoduino	ATmega328P-MU	Femtoduino	Femtoduino PCB vs dime An ultra-small (20.7x15.2 mm) Arduino compatible board designed by Fabio Varesano.
Freeduino USB Mega 2560	ATmega2560	Bhasha Technologies	Freeduino USB Mega 2560, designed in India with Male headers (coming soon with Female Headers). Suitable for use in project, R&D, device and applications Freeduino USB Mega 2560 is a cost-effective and 100% pin and software compatible to the popular Arduino Mega 2560. Uses through hole components and has male headers.
Freeduino Lite v2	ATmega8/168/328	Bhasha Technologies	Freeduino Lite v2 is a low cost, Freeduino with no USB and serial port. Needs FTDI USB Cable or FTDI Breakout board for programming. Uses through hole components and has male headers.
Freeduino Serial	ATmega8/168/328	Bhasha Technologies	Freeduino Serial is a low cost Freeduino board with serial DB9 connector. Uses the MAX232 chip for serial connectivity.
Freeduino NANO	ATmega328	Bhasha Technologies	Freeduino nano designed in India, completely breadboard friendly, elegant and compact design. Freeduino Nano is a low cost Arduino Nano compatible board with mini USB connector using SMD components Freeduino Nano.
iDuino			A USB board for breadboarding, manufactured and sold as a kit by Fundamental Logic.
IMUduino	ATmega32U4	Femtoduino.com	The world's first wireless 3D position, inertia, and orientation beacon. Designed in the San Francisco bay area, this board provides a 10-DoF IMU with on-board ATmega32U4 chip (the same as the Arduino Leonardo).
JeeNode	ATmega328P	JeeLabs	Low-cost, low-size, radio-enabled Arduino-compatible board running at 3.3 V. Inspired by the Modern Device RBBB (above) with a HopeRF RFM12B wireless module and a modular I/O design supporting a wide range of interfaces.
LCDuino	ATmega328P	Geppetto Electronics	A combination of an ATmega328P and an I²C based RGB backlit LCD interface (software compatible with the Adafruit RGB LCD shield), along with a USB serial programming interface done as a "backpack" module for the LCD.
LEDuino			A board with enhanced I²C, DCC decoder and CAN-bus interfaces. Manufactured using surface mount and sold assembled by Siliconrailway.
Moteino	ATmega328P	LowPowerLab	An SD-card size wireless-enabled breadboard friendly Arduino compatible board running at 16 MHz/3.3 V. It can mate with either an RFM12B or RFM69W/HW/CW transceiver from HopeRF, allowing very low cost wireless communication (also available without a transceiver). These are the different types of available Moteino boards and their transceiver options. Programmable from the Arduino IDE through an FTDI cable/adapter, or directly through the USB interface (Moteino-USB revision). Moteino runs DualOptiboot, a custom version of Optiboot that allows wireless programming when external FLASH memory is present. The new MoteinoMEGA based on Atmega1284P offers more I/O, an extra hardware serial port, a massive 128 KB of flash for sketches and 16 KB of RAM (8X more!).
Narrow	Atmega644 / Atmega1284	Pandauino?	Lightweight (8 grams), small form factor, much like the Nano but implementing an Atmega644 or Atmega1284 MCU; 24 digital I/O pins, 8 analog pins, up to 8 PWM and 2 USART ports; High memory, up to 16 KB RAM; Low power; With optional 0.49" OLED
NavSpark	Venus822 (Leon3 SPARC V8 compatible, 100 MHz 32-bit RISC)	SkyTraq	The modified Arduino IDE allows the compiled user sketch to be uploaded onto the processor either with or without the proprietary GNSS software. NavSpark has 17 GPIO pins, which include two UARTs, 1 I²C, 1 SPI, 1 PWM, and a trigger. The first UART is usually used by the GNSS software to output NMEA 0183 data, although this can be disabled. This UART communicates over USB through a PL2303 serial converter and the transmit output is also made available on a pin. A 1 pulse per second signal is produced on a dedicated pin when a valid fix has been made. There is a GPS-only version, a combined GPS/GLONASS version, and a GPS/Beidou version. An adaptor board adds a JST connector for a lithium-ion battery, a charger for the battery, and a microSD card slot connected to the SPI pins.
NB1A			An Arduino-compatible board that includes a battery backed up real-time clock and a four channel DAC. Most Arduino-compatible boards require an additional shield for these resources.
NB2A			Sanguino-compatible board that includes a battery backed up real-time clock and a two channel DAC. Sanguino's feature the ATmega644P, which has additional memory, I/O lines and a second UART.
Nymph	ATmega328P		A compact board with Molex connectors, aimed at environments where vibration could be an issue.
Oak Micros om328p			An Arduino Duemilanove compacted down to a breadboardable device (36 mm x 18 mm) that can be inserted into a standard 600 mil 28-pin socket, with USB capability, ATmega328P, and 6 onboard LEDs.
OpenTag	ATmega328P	Loggerhead Instruments	Arduino-compatible microSD motion datalogging board with accelerometer, magnetometer, gyroscope, pressure, temperature and real-time clock.
Paperduino	ATmega168		An ultra low-cost Arduino compatible, built on a printed paper and cardboard substrate, rather than a PCB.
Photon	STM32F205 (Cortex-M3)	Particle	An ARM-based Wi-Fi development kit with a Broadcom BCM43362 Wi-Fi chip supporting 802.11b/g/n.
PicoDuino	ATtiny85	Peter Misenko	PicoDuino size demonstration.: Requires special version of the Arduino IDE (Digispark IDE recommended); Digispark compatible SW/HW; Trinket compatible HW (due to bootloader USB vid restriction); Ultra small board 22 mm x 12 mm; RGB led; Relay/motor driver; Reset button.
Pro Micro	ATmega32U4	Sparkfun and clones	A popular low-cost compact Arduino-compatible board. Available in 3.3 V and 5 V versions.
Rainbowduino			An Arduino-compatible board designed specifically for driving LEDs. It is generally used to drive an 8x8 RGB LED matrix using row scanning, but it can be used for other things.
Sanguino	ATmega644		An open source enhanced Arduino-compatible board that uses an ATmega644P instead of an ATmega168. This provides 64 KB of flash, 4 KB of RAM and 32 general I/O pins in a 40-pin DIP device. It was developed with the RepRap Project in mind.
Sippino		SpikenzieLabs	A miniature Arduino compatible board with all of the digital and analog I/O pins brought out into a single line of pins (SIP). Available as a kit, intended for use with a solderless breadboard.
SODAQ Mbili	ATmega1284P	SODAQ	SODAQ, an Arduino Compatible Solar Powered sensor board The Raspberry Pi-sized SODAQ board is built for Solar Powered Data Acquisition. It is fitted with a Lipo charge controller and 12 Grove sockets for plug and play prototyping. It runs at 3.3 V and 8 MHz. It also comes with a DS3231 Real Time Clock and 16 Mbit serial flash for data logging. Its "bee" socket can use a range of different modules, like Xbee, RFbee, Bluetoothbee and GPRSbee to make the board communicate. The latest version has the powerful ATmega1284P microcontroller with 128 KB program space and 16 KB RAM and is still Arduino IDE compatible. Specifications: Power supply by LiPo battery (3.7 V) or via Micro USB connector; Solar charge controller with JST connector for Solar Panel up to 2.5 W; Battery Monitor; DS3231 Real Time Clock and Temperature sensor, clock backup powered by LiPo battery; On/Off switch. With the switch in Off position the solar charge circuit is still active and the RTC clock is still powered.; ICSP programming header
Sparrow	ATmega328P	Open Home Automation	Arduino compatible board designed specifically for RF mesh network experiments. It features 10 I/Os, a 10-pin ISP programming connector, a connector for a standard LCD (in 4 bit mode) and a connector for a 2.4 GHz RF module.
Spider Controller			Arduino Mega compatible board designed specifically for robots requiring large numbers of servos. A built in 3 A switchmode power supply allows servos to plug directly into the board. Pin spacing allows making custom shields from standard prototype board.
Stickduino			Similar to a USB key.
Teensy 2.0	ATmega32U4 8 bit AVR 16 MHz	PJRC	Teensy 2.0 microcontroller Boards from PJRC.com that run most Arduino sketches using the Teensyduino software add-on to the Arduino IDE.
Teensy 2.0++	AT90USB1286 8 bit AVR 16 MHz	PJRC	Teensy++ 2.0 microcontroller A slightly more powerful version of the Teensy 2.0. It has 46 I/O pins; 8 KB RAM; 128 KB of flash; 10-bit ADC; UART, SPI, I²C, I²S, Touch and other I/O capability.
Teensy 3.0	MK20DX128 32 bit ARM Cortex-M4 48 MHz	PJRC	A very small board based on the Freescale MK20DX128VLH5 CPU. It has 34 I/O pins; 16 KB RAM; 128 KB of flash; 16-bit ADC; 3xUARTs, SPI, I²C, I²S, Touch and other I/O capability. Version 3.0 is not recommended for new designs.
Teensy 3.1/3.2	MK20DX256 32 bit ARM Cortex-M4 72 MHz	PJRC	Same form factor as Teensy 3.0. Based on the Freescale MK20DX256VLH7 CPU. It has 34 I/O pins; 64 KB RAM; 256 KB of flash; 2x16-bit ADC; 12-bit DAC; 3xUARTs, SPI, 2xI²C, I²S, CAN bus, Touch and other I/O capability. All digital pins are 5 volt tolerant. Teensy 3.2 adds a more powerful 3.3 volt regulator, with the ability to directly power ESP8266 Wi-Fi, WIZ820io Ethernet and other power-hungry 3.3 V add-on boards.
Teensy 3.5	MK64FX512VMD12 32 bit ARM Cortex-M4F 120 MHz	PJRC	Form factor compatible with Teensy 3.0/3.1/3.2, with more pins directly available. Based on the NXP/Freescale MK64FX512VMD12 CPU. It has 58 I/O pins; 256 KB RAM; 512 KB of flash; 27 analog inputs on 2x16-bit ADC; 2x12-bit DAC; 17 timers (20 PWM outputs); 6xUARTs, 3xSPI, 3xI²C, 2xI²S, CAN bus, On-board Micro SD Card, Touch and other I/O capability. All digital pins are 5 volt tolerant.
Teensy 3.6	MK66FX1M0VMD18 32 bit ARM Cortex-M4F 160 MHz	PJRC	Form factor compatible with Teensy 3.0/3.1/3.2, with more pins directly available. Based on the NXP/Freescale MK66FX1M0VMD18 CPU. It has 58 I/O pins; 256 KB RAM; 1024 KB of flash; 25 analog inputs on 2x16-bit ADC; 2x12-bit DAC; 19 timers (22 PWM outputs); 6xUARTs, 3xSPI, 3xI²C, 2xI²S, CAN bus, 2nd USB (Host mode supported); On-board Micro SD Card, Touch and other I/O capability. I/O pins are not 5 V tolerant.
Teensy 4.0	i.MXRT1062 32 bit ARM Cortex-M7 600 MHz by NXP Semiconductors	PJRC	The Teensy 4.0 has an NXP i.MXRT1062 ARM Cortex-M7 at 600 MHz with 1024 KB RAM (512 KB is tightly coupled), 2048 KB flash (64K reserved for recovery & EEPROM emulation), two USB ports, both 480 Mbit/s, three CAN bus channels (one with CAN FD), two I²S Digital Audio, 1 S/PDIF Digital Audio, 1 SDIO (4 bit) native SD, SPI, all with 16 word FIFO, 3 I²C, all with 4 byte FIFO, 7 serial, all with 4 byte FIFO, 32 general purpose DMA channels, 31 PWM pins, 40 digital pins, all interrupt capable, 14 analog pins, 2 ADCs on chip, Cryptographic Acceleration, Random Number Generator, Pixel Processing Pipeline, Peripheral cross triggering and more in a tiny 1.4 by 0.7 inch Teensy 3.0/3.1/3.2 form factor
Teensy LC	MKL26Z64VFT4 ARM Cortex-M0+ 48 MHz	PJRC	A lower cost version of the Teensy 3.1/3.2. It has 27 I/O pins; 64 KB of flash; 12-bit DAC; 3xUARTs, 2xSPI, 2xI²C, I²S, Touch and other I/O capability. I/O pins are not 5 V tolerant. No FIFOs on serial 1 and serial2. Fewer hardware timers.
TinyDuino	ATmega328P	TinyCircuits	A fully capable Arduino platform smaller than a quarter, yet with all the power and functionality of the Arduino Uno board, including stackable shield support. The TinyDuino also support an option coin cell holder and has many expansion shields available.
TinyLily	ATmega328P	TinyCircuits	A fully capable Arduino platform smaller than a dime, designed for e-textiles. Includes large sewtabs and a header for a USB adapter for communication and programming.
Trinket	ATtiny85	Adafruit	Requires updates to Arduino IDE (or download special version) and driver under Windows. Includes regulator for battery power away from PC. Very low cost.
Wireless Widget			A compact (35 mm x 70 mm), low voltage, battery powered Arduino-compatible board with onboard wireless capable of ranges up to 120 m. The Wireless Widget was designed for both portable and low cost Wireless sensor network applications.
Whisper Node AVR	ATmega328P	Wisen - Talk²	A real ultra-low power board, capable of running of a single AA. The board counts with an efficient step-up regulator (MCP16251) and can be powered from 0.9 V. The Whisper Node has a built-in RFM69 long-range sub-GHz radio and 4 Mbit flash memory. The board can also run from a standard power supply and use the battery as backup. Additionally it can be upgraded to include a RTC chip or a high-voltage LDO. On field tests the Whisper Node was able to communicate on distances over 1 km line-of-sight and can run for years on battery, making a great platform for remote sensing and IoT applications.
Whisper Node LoRa	ATmega328P	Wisen - Talk²	A real ultra-low power board, capable of running of a single AA. The board counts with an efficient step-up regulator (MCP16251) and can be powered from 0.9 V. The Whisper Node has a built-in RFM95 LoRa long-range sub-GHz radio, also known as Semtech SX1276 and 4 Mbit flash memory. The board can also run from a standard power supply and use the battery as backup. Additionally it can be upgraded to include a RTC chip or a high-voltage LDO.
ZB1			An Arduino-compatible board that includes a Zigbee radio (XBee). The ZB1 can be powered by USB, a wall adapter or an external battery source. It is designed for low-cost Wireless sensor network applications.
SunDuino2	ATmega16/32/324/644		An open source enhanced Arduino-compatible board that uses an ATmega16/32/324/644 instead of an ATmega168. This provides 16/32/64 KB of flash, and 32 general I/O pins in a 40-pin DIP device.
OpenEnergyMonitor emonTx	ATmega328		An open-source low power wireless (RFM12B) energy monitoring node based on ATmega328 and JeeNode design and uses the Nanode (another Arduino compatible) design for their receiver.
panStamp	ATmega328	panStamp	Small low-power wireless motes and base boards. Communication library, configuration tools and automation applications are available for panStamps. These wireless miniatures can easily be hooked to different cloud data services via Lagarto, an open automation platform developed for panStamps.
Microduino	ATmega168/328/644/1284	Microduino Studio	1" x 1.1" small, stackable, low-cost Arduino-compatible board with a uniformed U-shape 27-pin standard interface.
Versalino Uno	ATmega328P	Virtuabotix	Versalino Uno 1.1 Compact board with pins in two similar layouts "Bus A" and "Bus B". 6 volt input 3.5 mm plug power. Programmed with FTDI.
LeoStick	ATmega32U4	Freetronics	Compact version of the Arduino Leonardo (which can be plugged straight into a USB port without a cable) and has a buzzer and a 3-in-1 RGB LED.
Wattuino Nanite	ATtiny85/ATtiny841	Watterott electronic	Very small size and microUSB plug for programming (Micronucleus USB Bootloader). Requires special board package for the Arduino IDE.
Wattuino Pro Mini PB	ATmega328PB	Watterott electronic	An Arduino Pro Mini compatible board with the new ATmega328PB. Requires special board package for the Arduino IDE.
eDOTcore	ATmega328P-PU		An ATmega328P-PU based Arduino compatible board with embedded DS3231 RTC R. 1.0 R. 1.1
PICO	ATmega32U4	MellBell Electronics	A successful Kickstarter project
uChip	SAMD21E18	Itaca Innovation	uChip mounted on a breadboard Arduino Zero compatible, with narrow (0.3" row spacing) 16-pin DIP footprint (breadboard compatible). It features built-in buck (to power external circuitry) and boost (to power USB devices when operating as a USB host) converters and software selectable output voltage.
Nucleo boards	STM8 / STM32	ST	Nucleo development boards for STM8 and STM32 microcontrollers from STMicroelectronics; Arduino compatible with the use of the Arduino_Core_STM32 on GitHub
Blue Pill board	STM32	ST	Blue Pill board for the 32bit STM32F103C8T6 microcontrollers from STMicroelectronics; Arduino compatible with the use of the Arduino_Core_STM32 on GitHub
Rhino Mini 328PB	ATmega328PB-AU	Cyrola Inc.	Arduino compatible board with MiniCore. Designed for a prototyping board. A secondary UART. On-grid pin layout. Pogo pin clip connectivity.
Rhino WAN	STM32L082CZ	Cyrola Inc.	Murata CMWX1ZZABZ-078 based Arduino compatible board. LoRaWAN™ connectivity.
CH55xduino	CH552	Deqing Sun	Arduino programming API for the CH55X, a family of low-cost MCS51 USB MCU comes with bootloader.

=== Non-ATmega ===
The following non-ATmega boards accept Arduino shield daughter boards. The microcontrollers are not compatible with the official Arduino IDE, but they do provide a version of the Arduino IDE and compatible software libraries.

Name	Processor	Host interface	Maker	Notes
PIC.duino Net	PIC18F67J60	Ethernet or serial	SlicMicro	Pin compatible with Arduino but uses the Ethernet enabled PIC microcontroller to connect to the Internet. Allows sending of email, display of JavaScript-enabled webpages, and remote web based access and control from around the world.
Leaflabs Maple	STM32 (Cortex-M3)	USB	LeafLabs	A 72 MHz 32-bit ARM Cortex-M3-based microcontroller (ST Microelectronics] STM32F103) with USB support, compatibility with Arduino shields, and 39 GP I/O pins. Programmable with the Open Source Maple IDE, which is a branch of the Arduino IDE. The Maple IDE includes both an implementation of the Arduino Language, and lower-level native libraries (with support from the libmaple C library). The more up-to-date Arduino_STM32 project allows use of the Maple, and other generic STM32 boards in version 1.6.12 of the Arduino IDE.
Microchip chipKIT Uno32, Max32, WF32, DP32	PIC32	USB	Digilent	32-bit MIPS-M4K PIC32MX processor boards (40-80 MHz). The Arduino libraries have been implemented natively for the PIC32MX and these kits run in a fork of the standard Arduino IDE, MPIDE and are compatible to most shields.
Microchip chipKIT Wi-Fire	PIC32MZ	USB	Digilent	32-bit MIPS-M4K PIC32MZ processor boards (200 MHz). The Arduino libraries have been implemented natively for the PIC32MZ and these kits run in a fork of the standard Arduino IDE, MPIDE and are compatible to most shields.
Freescale Freedom	Kinetis-L (Cortex-M0+)	USB	Freescale	A 48 MHz 32-bit ARM Cortex-M0+-based microcontroller (Freescale MKL25Z128VLK4) with USB support, compatibility with Arduino shields and 64 GP I/O pins. Board embeds the new ARM OpenSDA debug and programming interface through USB and is compatible with the majority of the ARM IDE suppliers.
PRO Family	ARM Cortex LPC1114 LPC1751 LPC1756	USB	Coridium	up to 200 MHz dual core ARM Cortex-M4F, ARM Cortex-M3 and ARM7TDMI-based shield-compatible boards, programmable in BASIC or C with sketch support with open source MakeItC utilities. All boards have 5 V tolerant I/Os.
Energia	MSP430	USB	Texas Instruments	The Energia project integrates this with the Arduino IDE.
Sakura board	Renesas RX63N	USB	Renesas/Wakamatsu Tsusho Co., Ltd	Web compiler with sketch support, Ethernet interface
HiFive1	SiFive E31 32 bit RISC-V	USB	SiFive	HiFive1 board Uno form factor, 5 V and 3.3 V, 19 digital I/O (9 PWM), 0 analogue in. 16 MB QSPI flash (execute in place, with 16 KB icache), 16 KB SRAM. Arduino IDE support with 16/256/320 MHz presets and port of Arduino library. Also works with standard C/C++, stdio, GDB from the shell. Hardware multiply (4 cycles) and divide (32 cycles).

== Non-Arduino ==
The following boards accept Arduino shield daughter boards. They do not use microcontrollers compatible with the Arduino IDE, nor do they provide an alternative implementation of the Arduino IDE and software libraries.

Name	Processor	Maker	Notes
ADICUP3028	ADuCM3029 (Cortex™-M3 )	Analog Devices	The EVAL-ADICUP3029 is an Arduino Uno form factor compatible platform based on the ultra low power ADuCM3029 32-bit ARM Cortex™-M3 microcontroller. The platform is designed to be a development and prototyping vehicle to get design ideas from concept to production with a minimal risk and faster time to market. The EVAL-ADICUP3029 is designed for IOT (Internet of Things) applications in mind, and therefore comes with on board Wi-Fi and Bluetooth 5.0 capabilities. A free version of CrossCore Embedded Studios (an Eclipse-based Analog Devices Interactive Development Environment) is supplied to the designer for debugging and application development. Add-on hardware modules, MCU drivers and software application examples help form a complete ecosystem that designers can leverage into their final product.
ADICUP360	ADuCM360 (Cortex M3)	Analog Devices	Arduino form factor compatible ARM Cortex-M3 Development Platform: 24-bit data acquisition system that incorporates dual high performance, multichannel sigma-delta (Σ-Δ) analog-to-digital converters (ADCs), a 32-bit ARM Cortex™-M3 processor, and flash/EEPROM memory on a single chip. The platform has an Arduino-Due compatible form factor and has two additional PMOD connectors. It is accompanied by an Eclipse-based development environment.
DAQduino	PIC18F2550 or PIC18F2553	PICcircuit.com	DAQduino is iCP12 usbStick that built in Arduino form of external ports connection. With these I/O ports, user can easily plug in different type of 3rd party Arduino extension boards with direct connection to USB port and SmartDAQ software. Great tool for parallel USB I/O control, signals monitoring (6 ch. oscilloscope) and data acquisition.
CIKU	PIC18F4550	Cytron Technologies	CIKU Features: Comes with pre-programmed PIC18F4550 with USB bootloader.; PIC18F4550 running at 48 MHz (after PLL with 10 MHz external crystal).; 32 Kbyte flash/program memory (~28 KB after bootloader).; 20 digital I/O pins.; 6 analog input pin.; 2 PWM output pin.; Extra pads with standard 0.1” (2.54 mm) pitch to pitch.; Program with MPLAB X IDE and XC8 compiler (library is open source and provided).; Program loading via USB HID, GUI from Microchip provided.
Chipino	PIC16F886-I/SP	Howtronics	Chipino is an electronics prototyping platform based on a Microchip PIC microcontroller. It was designed to use the same footprint and connection scheme as the official Arduino boards to allow Arduino shields to be used with Chipino.
Bambino 210	NXP LPC4330	Microint USA	Dual core ARM Cortex-M4/M0, 264 KB SRAM, 4 MB flash, mbed HDK, Arduino-compatible headers. The Bambino 210E has the same features as the 210, but adds a 10/100 Ethernet port, 8 MB flash, microSD socket, and Xbee Socket
Cypress PSoC 4 Pioneer Kit (CY8CKIT-042)	Cypress PSoC4 CY8C4245AXI-483	Cypress	The PSoC 4 Pioneer Kit is a development platform enabling users to design with the ARM Cortex-M0 PSoC 4 device family. The kit features the PSoC 4200 device family as the main processor and includes a PSoC 5LP (ARM Cortex-M3 processor) to perform programming and debugging. The kit is supported using PSoC Creator, which is a free IDE for embedded development targeting the PSoC 3/4/5LP device families. In the summer of 2013 Cypress supported the kit with a 100 projects in 100 days campaign on the community forums at Element14.
Arduino Shield Compatible Propeller Board	Parallax Propeller	Parallax	Based on the Parallax Propeller; interfaces with standard Arduino shields. The Propeller comes with a free IDE called "propeller tool", and an alternative IDE tool is available.
Amicus18	PIC		Amicus18 is an embedded system platform based on PIC architecture (18F25K20). Can be programmed with any programming language, though the Amicus IDE is free and complete.
Cortino	ARM STM32		Development system for a 32-bit ARM Cortex-M3-based microcontroller.
Pinguino	PIC		Board based on a PIC microcontroller, with native USB support and compatibility with the Arduino programming language plus an IDE built with Python and sdcc as compiler.
Unduino	PIC		A board based on the dsPIC33FJ128MC202 microcontroller, with integrated motor control peripherals.
Netduino	Cortex-M4 (STM32F4) (ARM7)	Wilderness Labs	168 MHz Cortex-M4 (STM32F4) with up to 1,408 KB of code storage and 164 KB of RAM. On-board USB, Ethernet, Wi-Fi, SD card slot. Support for the .NET Micro Framework. Development environment is MS Visual Studio and C#. Pin compatible with Arduino shields although drivers are required for some shields.
Vinculo	Vinculum II		FTDI USB development board for the FTDI Vinculum II microcontroller.
FEZ Domino, FEZ Panda, and FEZ Panda II	ARM		72 MHz 32-bit ARM (GHI Electronics USBizi chips) micro-controller boards with support for the .NET Micro Framework. Pin compatible with Arduino shields, although drivers are required for some shields.
TheUno	Freescale S08DZ60	MyFreescaleWebPage	Freescale 8-bit S08DZ60 based Arduino Shield Compatible development board. Programmable in C or assembly language using the free CodeWarrior development environment from Freescale, based on Eclipse. Integrated open-source debugging cable for fast prototyping.
BigBrother	Freescale MCF51AC256	MyFreescaleWebPage	Freescale 32-bit Coldfire MCF51AC256 based Arduino Shield Compatible development board. Programmable in C or assembly language using the free CodeWarrior development environment from Freescale, based on Eclipse and in C++ with CodeSourcery. Integrated open-source debugging cable for fast prototyping. The first Arduino Shield Compatible board with two Arduino slots to add more and more shields.
BigBrother-USB	Freescale MCF51JM128	MyFreescaleWebPage	Freescale 32-bit Coldfire MCF51JM128 based Arduino Shield Compatible development board. Programmable in C or assembly language using the free CodeWarrior development environment from Freescale, based on Eclipse and in C++ with CodeSourcery. Integrated open-source debugging cable for fast prototyping. The first Arduino Shield Compatible board with two Arduino slots to add more and more shields.
Firebird32	Coldfire		Freescale 32-bit Coldfire MCF51JM128 based Arduino Shield Compatible development board. Programmable in StickOS BASIC, and C or assembly language using Flexisframework or CodeWarrior with a step-by-step debugger. The Firebird32 is also available in a special model based on the 8-bit MC9S08JM60.
Stampduino	PIC or Parallax SX	Parallax	Arduino Shield compatible BASIC Stamp 2 board, interfaces with most standard Arduino shields, and comes with a free IDE.
SunDuinoPIC	PIC18F2550 or PIC18F4550		Microchip PIC Arduino hardware compatible board. Based PINGUINO Project. USB HID Bootloader.
Breeze	PIC		Breeze boards are prototyping platforms for 28-pin PIC microcontrollers. They come with a PIC18F25K22 (USB-UART interface) or PIC18F25J50 (direct USB interface), however almost any 28-pin PIC can be used with the platform.
