= Limor Fried =

American electrical engineer

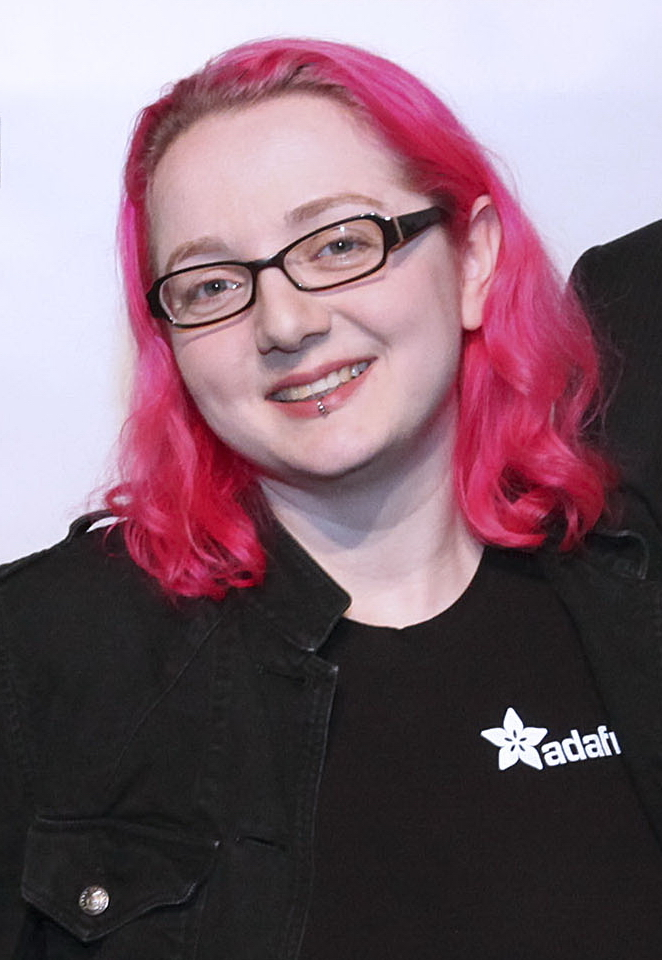
- Limor Fried at TechCrunch Disrupt NY (2013)
- Born: Brookline, Massachusetts, US
- Other name: ladyada
- Education: MIT (SB, 2003; MEng 2005)
- Occupation: Electrical engineer
- Known for: Adafruit Industries; Open source movement Open-source hardware movement
- Spouse: Phillip Torrone
- Website: www.ladyada.net

Limor Fried is an American electrical engineer and owner of the electronics hobbyist company Adafruit Industries. She is influential in the open-source hardware community, having participated in the first Open Source Hardware Summit and the drafting of the Open Source Hardware definition, and is known by her moniker ladyada, an homage to Lady Ada Lovelace.

== Career and recognition ==
Fried studied at MIT, earning a BS in electrical engineering and computer science (EECS) in 2003 and a Master of Engineering in EECS in 2005. For part of the qualification she created a project called Social Defense Mechanisms: Tools for Reclaiming Our Personal Space. Following the concept of critical design she prototyped glasses that darken when a television is in view, and a low-power RF jammer that prevents cell phones from operating in a user's personal space.

Fried was an Eyebeam fellow from 2005 to 2006.

During 2005, Fried founded what became Adafruit Industries, first in her MIT dorm room, later moving to New York City. The company designs and resells open source electronic kits, components, and tools, mainly for the hobbyist market. In 2010 the company had eight employees and shipped more than $3 million worth of product. The company's mission extends beyond the adult hobbyist audience to pre-school STEM education. Adafruit is a company based on sharing ideas as well as resources; everyone who works for the company is offered the same 401k plan and they get paid time off for volunteer nonprofit work.

In 2009, she was awarded the Pioneer Award by the Electronic Frontier Foundation for her participation in the open source hardware and software community.

In 2011, Fried was awarded the Most Influential Women in Technology award by Fast Company magazine and became the first female engineer featured on the cover of Wired magazine. In that same issue of Wired she said, "Having websites that sell parts online is a really big deal. It used to be that if you wanted to order parts to make something, you had to dig through a catalog, and they probably wouldn't even send you one if you weren't a professional. Now everything is online. You can just Google the parts to make your submarine."

In a 2012 interview with CNET, Fried said, "If there's one thing I'd like to see from this, it would be for some kids to say to themselves 'I could do that' and start the journey to becoming an engineer and entrepreneur." She is also quoted as saying, "There's always something newer and funner and more glossy, but we want to make sure people can actually build stuff, too."

Fried is a member of the IEEE Spectrum editorial advisory board as of 2017.

== Awards ==
- 2009 Pioneer Award by the Electronic Frontier Foundation
- 2011 Most Influential Women in Technology award by Fast Company magazine
- 2012 Entrepreneur "Entrepreneur of the Year". Of the 15 finalists, she was the only female.
- 2015 White House Champion of Change (Making)
- 2018 Forbes' America's Top 50 Women In Tech.
- 2019 STEP Ahead Honoree, Women in Manufacturing by The Manufacturing Institute
- 2019 Women in Open Source Award (Community) by Red Hat
- 2023 GitHub Awards - Hardware Hacker
- 2026 Forbes 250 America's Greatest Innovators

== Open Kinect Project ==
In response to the launch of Microsoft's Kinect for the Xbox 360 in 2010, Fried, along with Phillip Torrone, organized a $1,000 challenge to create an open source driver. After Microsoft condemned the challenge as modification to their product, Adafruit increased the prize to $2,000 and then $3,000. This prompted a response from a Microsoft company spokesperson:

Microsoft does not condone the modification of its products ... With Kinect, Microsoft built in numerous hardware and software safeguards designed to reduce the chances of product tampering. Microsoft will continue to make advances in these types of safeguards and work closely with law enforcement and product safety groups to keep Kinect tamper-resistant.

After significant advancements in the open source drivers, spokespeople from Microsoft stated that they did not condemn the challenge, and in fact were excited to see what the community developed.

== Personal life ==
Fried is married to Hackaday founder, former Make editor, and former Engadget podcast host Phillip Torrone. In 2022 they had a baby.

== See also ==
- Adafruit Industries
- Ayah Bdeir – entrepreneur and founder of littleBits
- Becky Stern – Maker and the former director of Wearable Electronics at Adafruit
- Jeri Ellsworth – entrepreneur and inventor of C64 Direct-to-TV
