= Platino =

Platino may refer to:

- Music recording sales certification, a system of certifying that a music recording has shipped or sold a certain number of copies
- Platino universal AVR board, an Arduino compatible microcontroller board
- Platino (wrestler) (born 1957), ring name of Mexican wrestler Chamaco Valaguez
