= FDTI =

FDTI may refer to:

- Functional Diffusion Tractography Imaging
- The California Learning Resources Network's Free Digital Textbook Initiative; cf. open educational resources
- Fault Detection Time Interval

== See also ==
- FTDI
