= FT32 =

FT32 is a 32-bit RISC instruction set architecture designed by FTDI and used in their FT90 series microcontrollers.
