= Mister Jalopy =

Mr. Jalopy (real name Peter Vermeren) is a leader in the Maker movement and a contributing editor to Make. He and the movement he espouses are trying to reconnect users with their tools, to reassert creative control over technology that is so sophisticated it is opaque to its users. In pursuit of that goal he blogs about repairs and inventions, and he encourages manufacturers to make products that are easier for users to maintain, repair, and even repurpose.

He is described as "a hero to the Maker Movement." He owns a store in Los Angeles that sells antiques, hardware, purified water and rebuilt bicycles.
