= John Edgar Park =

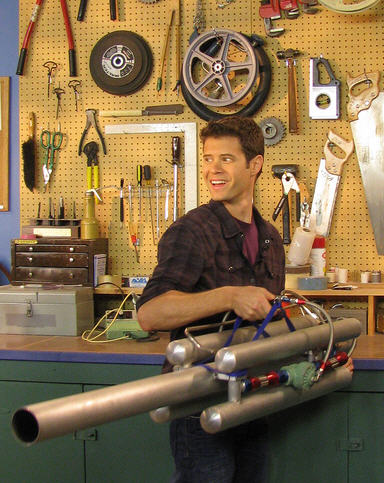
- John Edgar Park on the set of Make: television.
- Education: Northfield Mount Hermon School; University of Virginia
- Occupation: Host of Make: Television
- Years active: 2009 - present
- Employer: Adafruit Industries
- Known for: Make: television
- Website: www.jpixl.net

John Edgar Park is a technical director in computer animation, author, and host of Make: television.

Park received a Bachelor of Arts in Drama from the University of Virginia in 1994, where he was a founding member of The New Dominions and sang in the Virginia Glee Club. He has worked as a computer graphics trainer at Sony Imageworks, and as a character technical director at Walt Disney Animation Studios and at DisneyToon Studios, where he currently works. At Disney, he has worked as a character rigger on Meet the Robinsons and Bolt.

Park's book, Understanding 3D Animation Using Maya, was written based on his experience teaching Maya at Sony Imageworks during the production of Spider-Man 2, The Polar Express, The Matrix Reloaded, and The Matrix Revolutions.

Park has been a contributor to Make (magazine) since September 2007 and to the Make blog since November 2008. In January 2009, Park became host of the public television series Make: television, where his segment, "Maker Workshop," demonstrates how to create and build such projects as a VCR powered cat feeder, Wii-powered personal flight recorder, portable trebuchet, and a shopping cart chair.

Park has appeared on the television programs The Screen Savers and Attack of the Show! on the G4 network.

Park currently works for Adafruit Industries. He hosts a weekly YouTube broadcast "John Park's Workshop".

== Bibliography ==
- Understanding 3D Animation Using Maya. Springer. 2004. ISBN 0-387-00176-X.
