= Becky Stern =

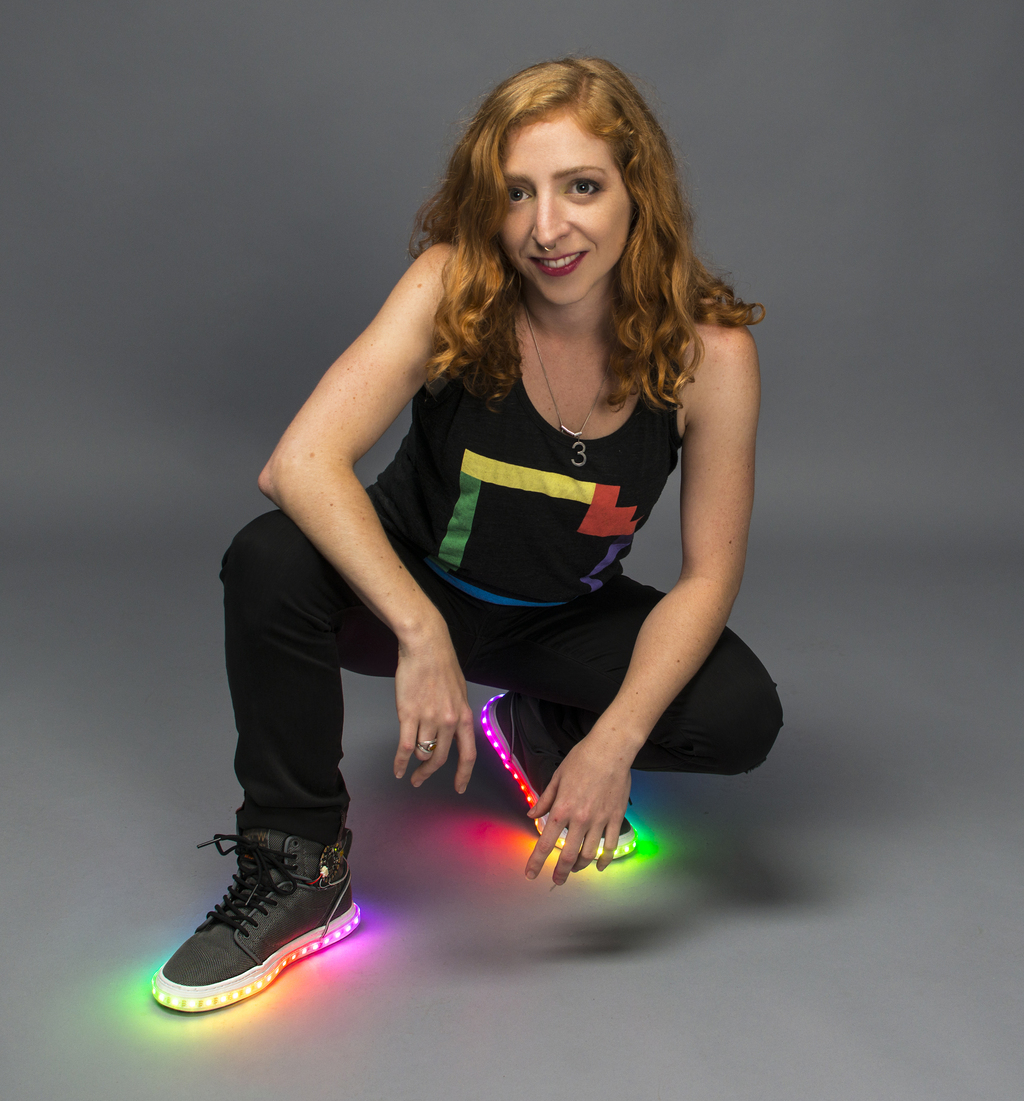
- Born: January 29, 1985 (age 41); Florida
- Education: BFA Design and Technology, Parsons School of Design
- Known for: DIY, crafts, new media

Becky Stern (born January 29, 1985) is a DIY expert based in New York City. Her work combines electronics, textile crafts, and fashion.

== Career ==
From 2007 to 2012 Stern worked as a blogger and senior video producer for MAKE and CRAFT magazines. She produced tutorials and videos about crafts and how to embed electronics in clothes and home goods.

From 2012 to 2016, Stern was the Director of Wearable Electronics at New York-based Adafruit Industries, where she published weekly video tutorials on do-it-yourself crafts and technology. She then became Content Creator at Instructables.

Stern holds an adjunct faculty position at School of Visual Arts in New York City. She's a member of the Brooklyn art combine Madagascar Institute and the Free Art & Technology Lab (F.A.T. Lab). Her artwork was featured in F.A.T. Gold: Five Years of Free Art & Technology, a retrospective of F.A.T. Lab's work, at Eyebeam, MU Eindhoven, and Gray Area Foundation for the Arts.

Her projects have also shown at the San Francisco Museum of Craft & Folk Art, Bildmuseet in Umeå, Sweden, and Gizmodo Gallery.
