= Rascal (single-board computer) =

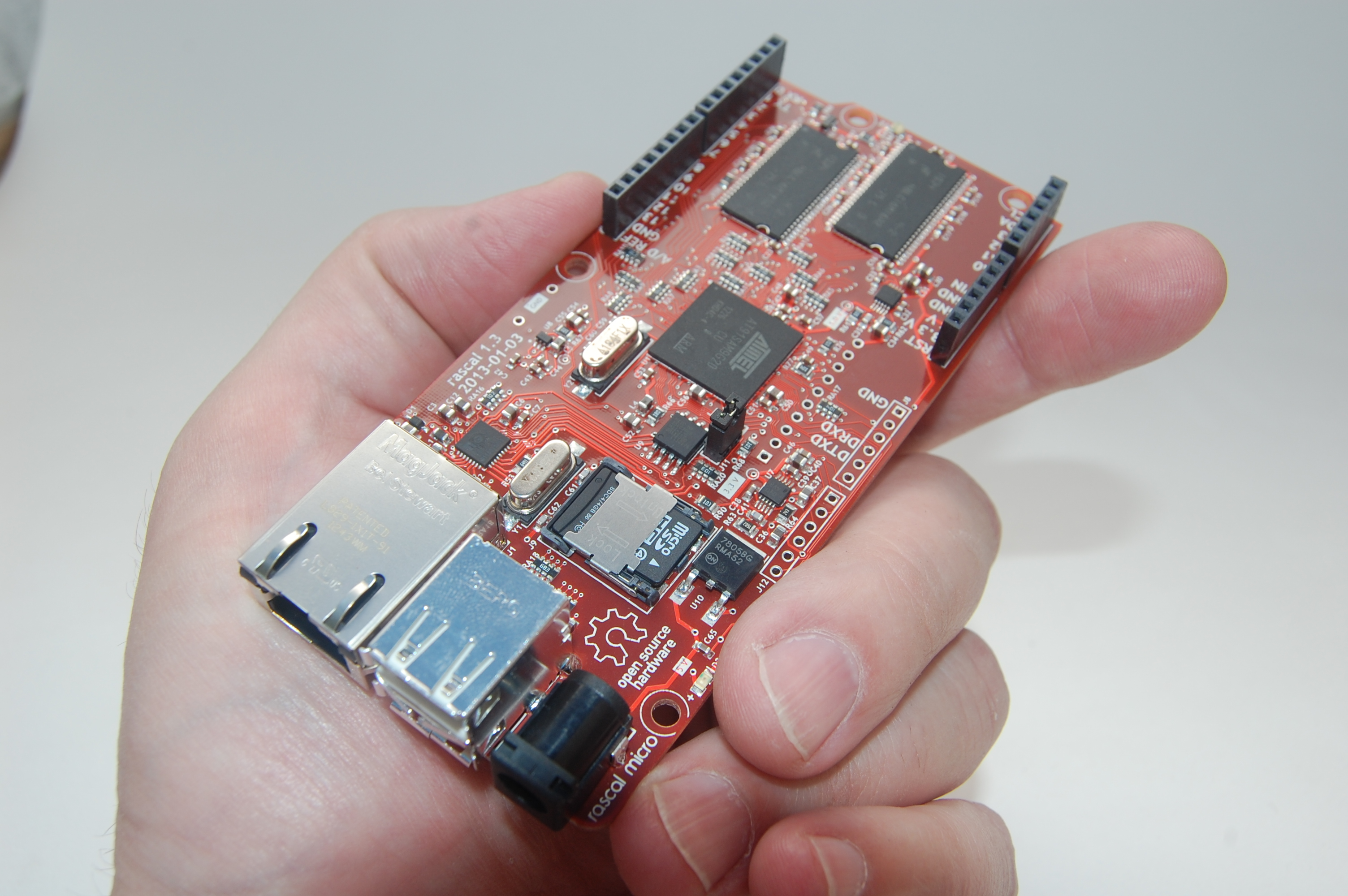
- Rascal 1.3
- Developer: Rascal Micro
- Type: Single-board computer
- Released: November 3, 2011; 14 years ago
- Introductory price: US$ 175
- Operating system: Linux
- CPU: ARM926EJ/S 400 MHz
- Memory: 64 MByte
- Storage: SD card slot (SD or SDHC card)
- Power: 1.25 W
- Website: rascalmicro.com

Rascal is a single-board computer. It is designed by Brandon Stafford and sold by Rascal Micro LLC in Somerville, Massachusetts.

== Features ==
The Rascal runs Linux. Its board design is compatible with Arduino shields. It includes web server software and is intended to be programmed in Python.

The Rascal's web server includes an editor that lets users edit the Python programs running on the Rascal from any web browser, without needing to reflash anything.

Most Arduino shields are compatible with the standard headers on the Rascal.

The Rascal's design files have been released as Open Hardware under the Creative Commons CC BY-SA license. Those design files have been posted to GitHub.
