= Adafruit Industries =

American electronic components and hardware distributor

Adafruit Industries, LLC

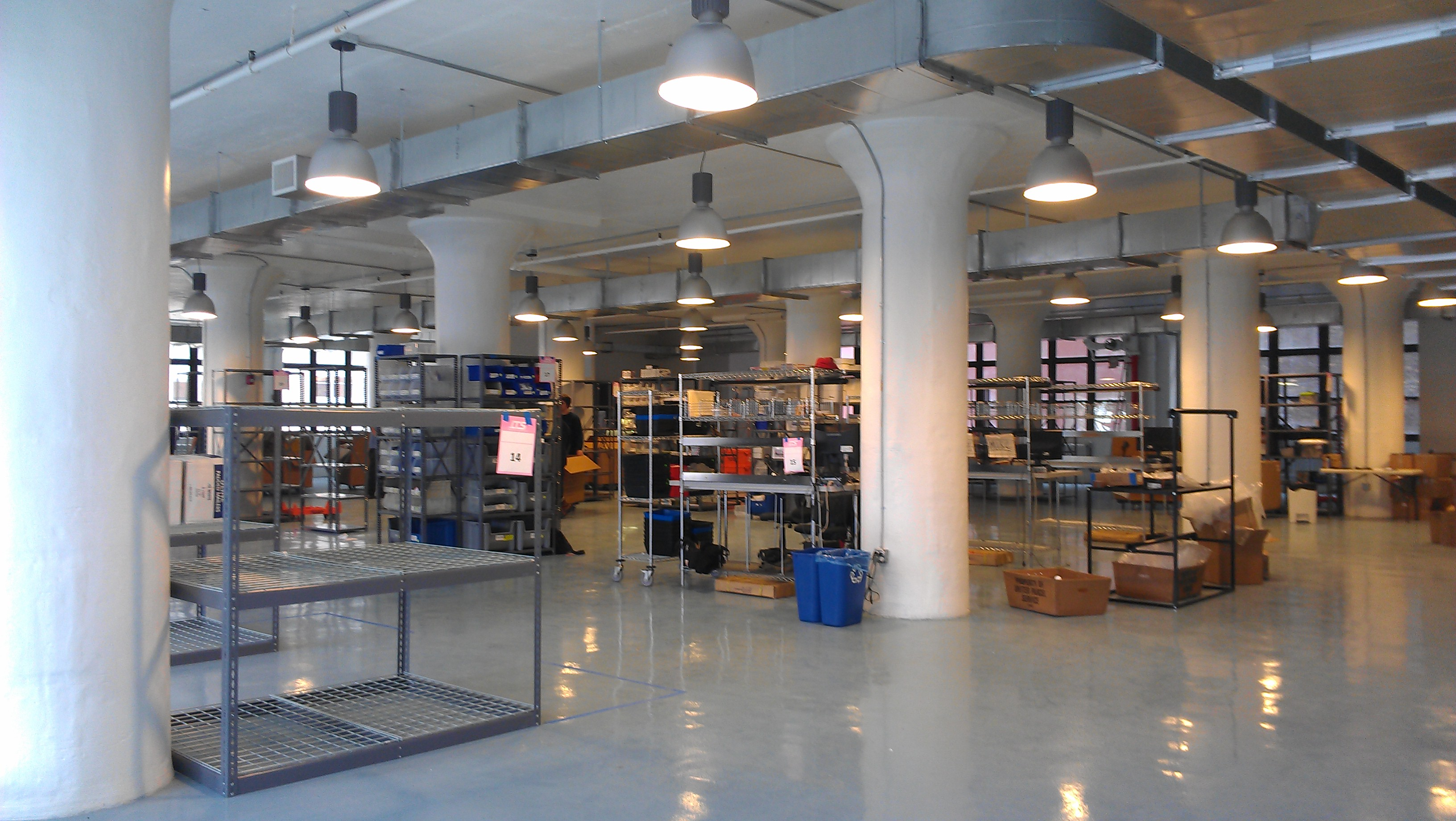
- Adafruit offices in New York
- Industry: Open-source hardware
- Founded: 2005
- Founder: Limor Fried
- Headquarters: New York City (Industry City, Brooklyn), New York, United States
- Revenue: US$45 million (2016)
- Number of employees: 105 (2016)
- Website: www.adafruit.com

Adafruit Industries is an open-source hardware company based in New York, United States. It was founded by Limor Fried in 2005. The company designs, manufactures and sells electronics products, electronics components, tools, and accessories. It also produces learning resources, including live and recorded videos about electronics, technology, and programming.

== History ==
Limor Fried, then a student at Massachusetts Institute of Technology, began selling electronic kits on her website from her own designs in 2005. She later moved to New York City and established Adafruit Industries.

In 2010, Adafruit offered a US$1,000 (equivalent to $1,476 in 2025) reward for whoever could hack Microsoft's Kinect to make its motion-sensing capabilities available for use for other projects. This reward was increased to $2,000 and then $3,000 after Microsoft said it would work to prevent such "tampering". In November, the reward was issued to Hector Martin for his open-source Kinect driver.

The company had $22 million in revenue in 2013 and $33 million in 2014.

== Company name ==
The name Adafruit comes from Fried's online moniker "Ladyada", a homage to computer science pioneer Ada Lovelace. The company aims to get more people involved in technology, science and engineering.

== Products ==
In addition to distributing third-party components and boards such as the Raspberry Pi, Adafruit develops and sells its own development boards for educational and hobbyist purposes. In 2016, the company released the Circuit Playground, a board with an Atmel ATmega32u4 microcontroller and a variety of sensors, followed in 2017 by the more powerful Atmel SAMD21 based Circuit Playground Express. They, like many Adafruit products, are circular in shape for ease of use in education and wearable electronics projects, along with the FLORA and Gemma, the company's wearable electronics development platforms. In 2017, Adafruit Industries' best-selling product was the Circuit Playground Express

=== Wearable Development Boards ===
Adafruit offers various electronic components designed to be used in wearable technology. In 2012, they introduced the FLORA, which was their first development board specifically designed for wearable electronics and inspired by the Arduino LilyPad. It featured a small circular shape (1.75 inch diameter), USB support, and various included sensors to simplify integration with E-textiles, and pins that allow the use of conductive thread. They are "Arduino-compatible", and designed to be programmable using custom board libraries for the Arduino IDE. One year later, Adafruit announced the Gemma board, which had many similar features with a smaller size. In addition to its original 2012 release, the FLORA underwent several hardware revisions. FLORA v2 was introduced in May of 2015 with a micro-USB port instead of a mini-USB port and added an integrated NeoPixel LED. The FLORA v3 followed in 2016 with revised sew pads for easier connections.

=== NeoPixel ===
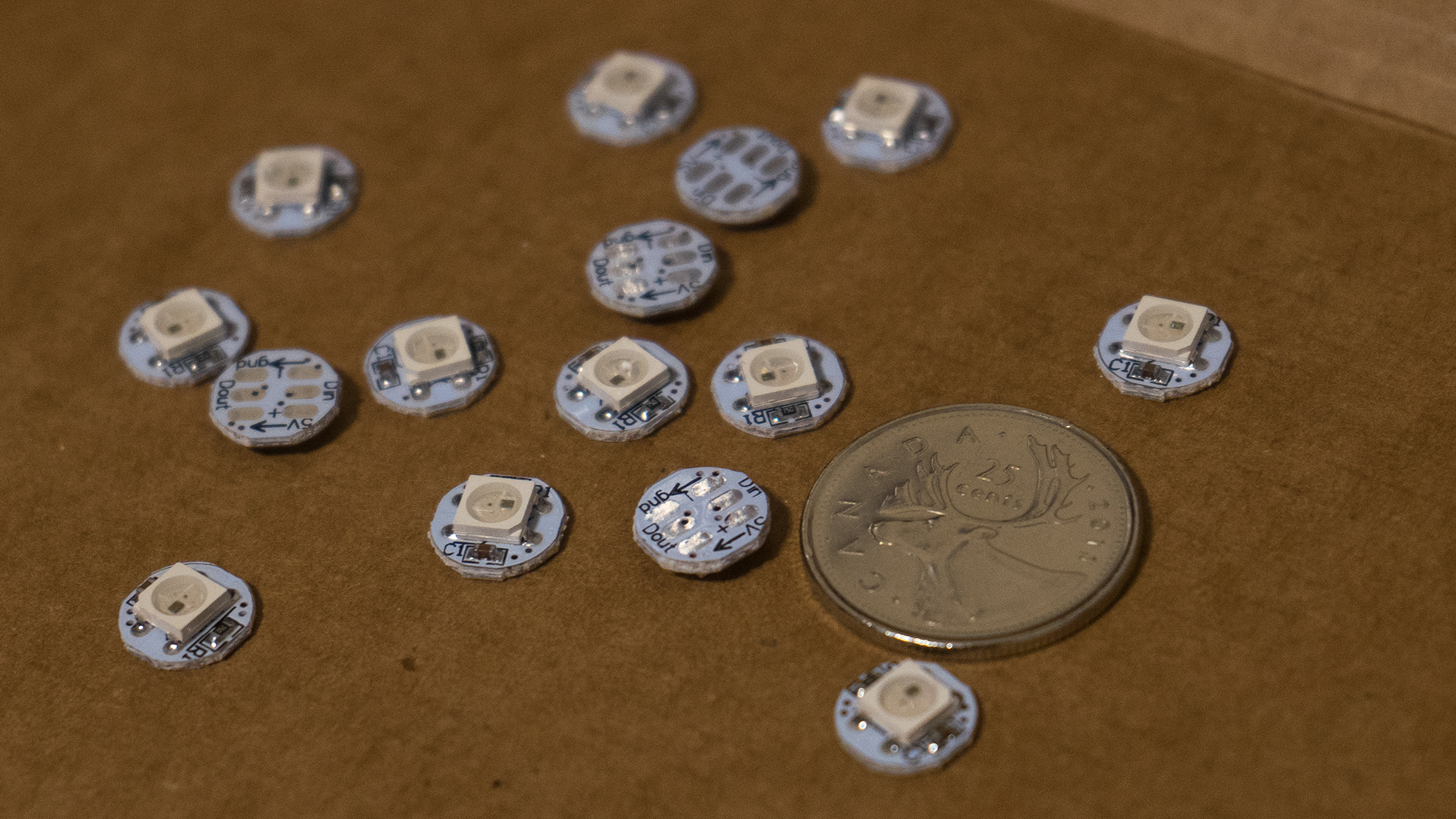
Mini NeoPixels with comparison to a Canadian quarter

NeoPixel is Adafruit's brand of individually addressable red-green-blue (RGB) LED. They are based on the WS2812 LED and WS2811 driver, where the WS2811 is integrated into the LED, for reduced footprint. Adafruit manufactures several products with NeoPixels with form factors such as strips, rings, matrices, Arduino shields, traditional five-millimeter cylinder LED and individual NeoPixel with or without a PCB. The control protocol for NeoPixels is based on only one communication wire. Adafruit provides an Arduino library and a Python Library to help with the programming of NeoPixels. In addition to the traditional RGB technology, Adafruit manufactures a red-green-blue-white (RGBW) variant of NeoPixel for all products except those that feature a NeoPixel Mini 3535. Those integrate an additional white LED in the package for extra possible color mixes and selectable white color temperature (the company sells single NeoPixels with a 6000 K, 4500 K and 3000 K color temperature).

=== CircuitPython ===
In January, 2017, Adafruit introduced CircuitPython, a fork of the MicroPython programming language optimized to run on Adafruit and third-party products. CircuitPython runs on Adafruit boards with a flash memory chip and a supported microcontroller or single-board computer.

In 2019, resources for CircuitPython were moved to circuitpython.org, reflecting the appearance of non-Adafruit boards that use CircuitPython. This includes CircuitPython for microcontrollers and CircuitPython on single-board computers using a compatibility layer Adafruit named "Blinka", to access general-purpose input/output functionality and compatibility.

Adafruit has fostered a community which has contributed software libraries for more than 488 sensors and drivers.

=== Feather development boards ===
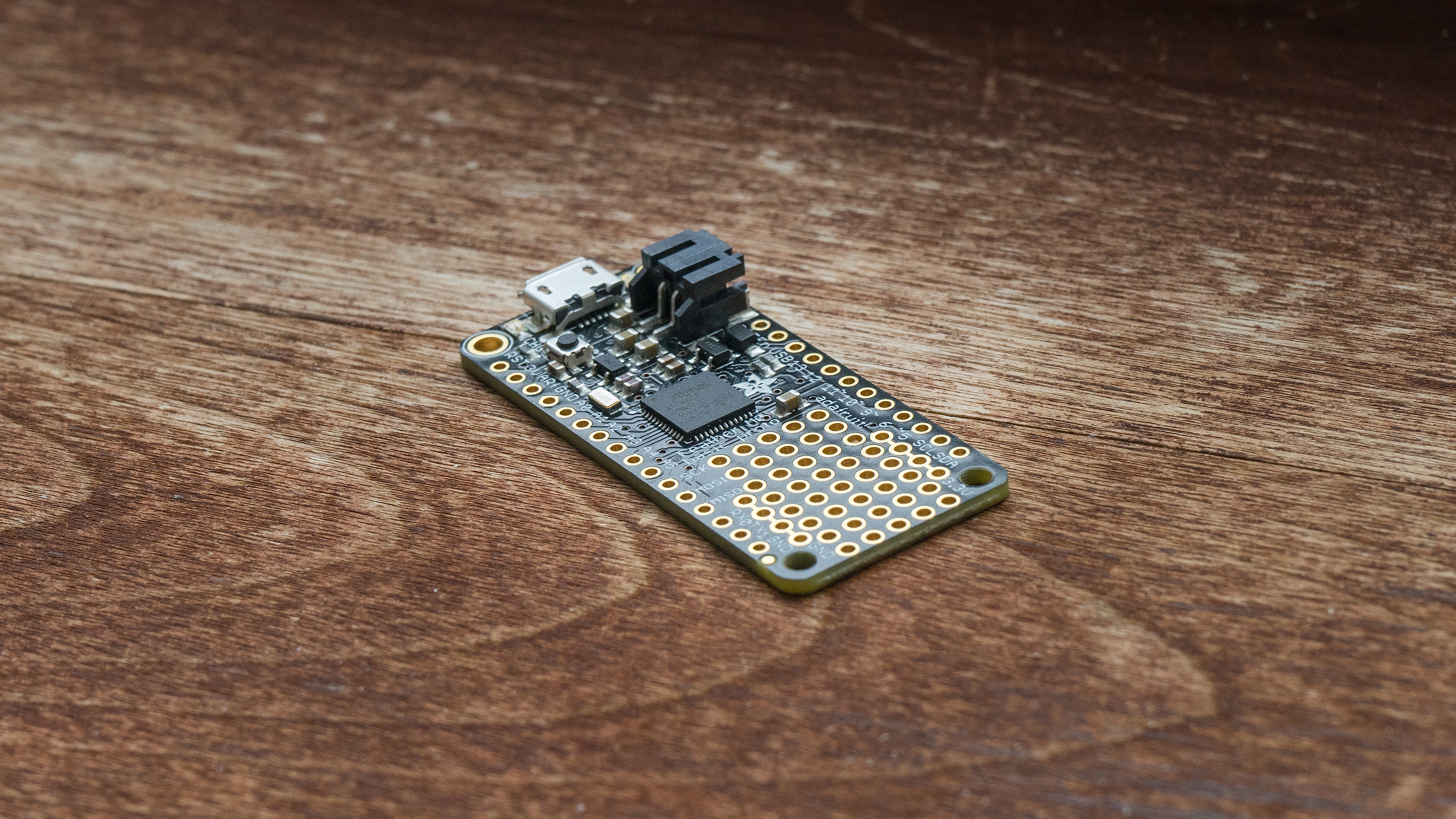
A headerless Adafruit Feather M0 Basic Proto Development Board

Feather is Adafruit's largest brand of "Arduino-like" boards and accessories. The boards share a form factor, pinouts, and lithium polymer battery charging. Certain boards add special features such as Bluetooth, Wi-Fi or cellular network connectivity, built-in prototyping space, or SD card communication. More features can be added with "FeatherWing" expansion cards that with an LCD or NeoPixel array, DC motor drivers, and other capabilities.

A fairly complete list of Feather form factor boards, FeatherWings and accessories has been compiled into a GitHub Awesome List.

== Adafruit Learning System ==
Adafruit publishes tutorials—nearly 3,000 as of 2024—that show how to build projects with their products, tear down wearable electronic devices, 3D printing, and more. The company also hosts articles written by collaborators.

== Presence on YouTube ==
Adafruit Industries has a substantial presence on the online video streaming website YouTube. The channel has been active since April 2, 2006. The company was awarded a YouTube Silver Play Button in August 2015 when it surpassed 100,000 subscribers; as of January 2025, it had 450,000. Adafruit creates different types of videos, all on electronics, with most featuring one of their products. Each week, several live shows are streamed.

=== Ask an Engineer ===
This weekly show was started in 2010 in Fried's living room. The concept was that viewers could ask her questions about engineering while she was assembling an electronics kit and Phillip Torrone, her spouse, was preparing shipments. The show is broadcast on YouTube with behind-the-scenes content available on Discord. The company states that this is the longest-running live electronics show. Some of the sections of the stream are new products where Fried demonstrates new products; Time Travel, where the hosts look back on the world of makers, hackers, artists and engineers and often highlight a special person or event; 3D Printing, where they showcase a special project or product related to the industry; a Q&A session; and a trivia question, where the first viewer with the correct answer wins a product. There is sometimes a section dedicated to Raspberry Pi and Arduino news and a section where the hosts read a positive email they have received. The show airs on Wednesdays at 8PM ET on the company's YouTube channel and is still run by Limor Fried and Phillip Torrone, with guests often present. As of February 2016, there have been almost 200 editions of the show, totalling almost 7 million minutes watched, a half million video views and 33 thousand playlist views.

=== Show-and-Tell ===
Show-and-Tell is Adafruit's live show where makers from all around the world share electronic projects they are currently working on. The show is first broadcast at 7:30PM ET on Wednesdays, and runs for 30 minutes. It is hosted by Limor Fried and Phillip Torrone and uses the Google+ Hangouts platform. Over the four years that it has been running, Show-and-Tell has been produced more than 200 times, collecting more than 2.8 million minutes watched, about 500,000 video views and with 27,000 playlist views.

=== 3D Hangouts with Noe and Pedro Ruiz ===
3D Hangouts with Noe and Pedro Ruiz goes over the 3D printing industry (most typically about desktop FDM printers). Every week, on Thursday, a 30-minute edition is released where the two brothers discuss news about the industry, specific projects that they are working on, share 3D printing tips and tricks and answer viewer's questions and comments. They also showcase projects and prints from the online community. The show was started in 2014.

=== John Park's Workshop ===
The weekly John Park's Workshop show is broadcast live from John Edgar Park's workshop as he builds creative technology projects – from mystery boxes to ninja timers to synthesizers to coffee robots – while teaching viewers the skills to create their own. The creations made by Park demonstrate the weekly project (which is later developed into a tutorial on Adafruit's Learning System), covers fundamental tips and tricks for working with the featured tools and materials, interacts with viewers, and answers questions over chat messaging systems in YouTube and Discord.

=== Wearable Electronics with Becky Stern ===
Wearable Electronics with Becky Stern was Adafruit's live show dedicated to the wearable electronics industry. It was hosted by the American artist Becky Stern. In the show, industry news, projects, techniques and materials were covered and discussed. It aired every Wednesday at 2PM ET and was produced for 122 episodes, from 2013 to 2016. The last edition was streamed on February 10, 2016.

== See also ==
- DigiKey
- Mouser Electronics
- Element 14
- SparkFun Electronics
