= XBee =

Motherboard

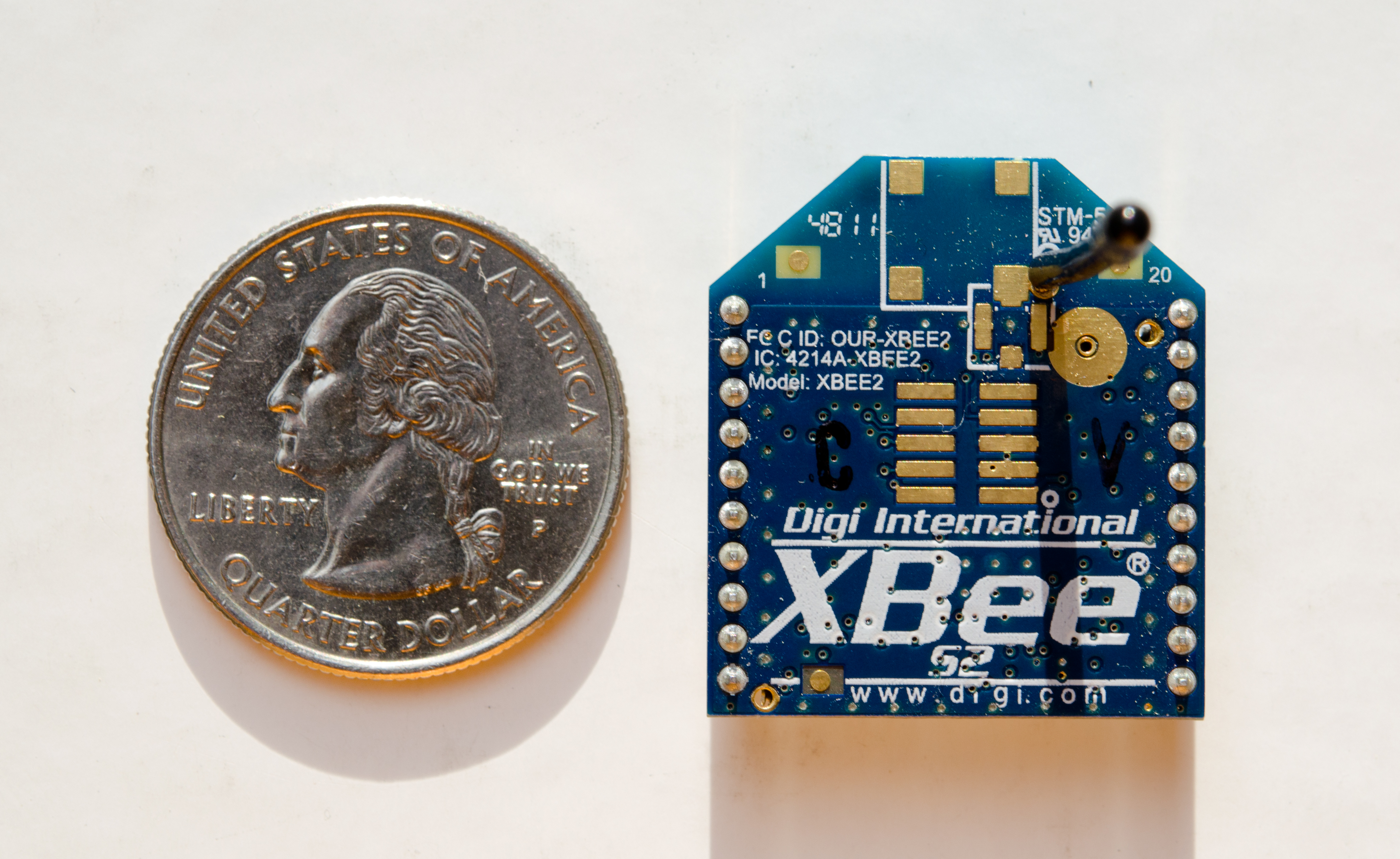
- An XBee radio with a Quarter (⌀ ≈ 24 mm). The XBee board is 24.38 mm (0.960 in) wide.
- Manufacturer: Digi International
- Type: Sensor
- CPU: Silicon Labs EM357 SoC
- Input: 20 GPIO pins
- Power: 2.1 to 3.6 V DC

Digi XBee is the brand name of a popular family of form factor compatible wireless connectivity modules from Digi International. The first XBee modules were introduced under the MaxStream brand in 2005 and were based on the IEEE 802.15.4-2003 standard designed for point-to-point and star communications. Since the initial introduction, the XBee family has grown and a complete ecosystem of wireless modules, gateways, adapters and software has evolved.

The XBee radios can all be used with the minimum number of connections — power (3.3 V), ground, data in and data out (UART), with other recommended lines being Reset and Sleep. Additionally, most XBee families have some other flow control, input/output (I/O), analog-to-digital converter (A/D) and indicator lines built in.

The latest XBee 3 family introduces new capabilities like MicroPython, Digi's TrustFence security framework and Bluetooth low energy for local commissioning, configuration, diagnostics or beaconing

== Supported technologies ==
Short Range (2.4 GHz)

- Zigbee, IEEE 802.15.4, DigiMesh, Bluetooth Low Energy

Long Range (868/900 MHz)

- Point-to-Point, Star topology, DigiMesh

Cellular / LPWAN

- LTE Cat-1, LTE-M / Narrowband IoT, 3G

== Form-factors, antennas and data modes ==
XBee modules are available in three form-factors. All XBees, with the exception of the XBee 868LP, are available in the popular 20-pin through-hole form-factor. The latest XBee modules are also available in surface-mount and micro-mount form-factors, which are popular for high-volume applications due to the reduced manufacturing costs of SMT.

- through-hole (TH)
- surface mount (SMT)
- micro-mount (MMT)

XBee modules typically come with several antenna options, including U.FL, on-board chip, RF pad and integrated PCB

XBee modules can operate either in a transparent data mode or in a packet-based application programming interface (API) mode.

- Transparent mode: data coming into the Data IN (DIN) pin are directly transmitted over-the-air to the intended receiving radios without any modification. Incoming packets can either be directly addressed to one target (point-to-point) or broadcast to multiple targets (star). This mode is primarily used in instances where an existing protocol cannot tolerate changes to the data format. AT commands are used to control the radio's setting
- API mode: data are wrapped in a packet structure that allows for addressing, parameter setting and packet delivery feedback, including remote sensing and control of digital I/O and analog input pins.

== Product family ==
As of March 2020, the Digi XBee portfolio includes

- Short Range (2.4 GHz)
  - XBee 3 (newest family featuring integrated Bluetooth low energy, MicroPython and TrustFence security framework)
    - 802.15.4 - point-to-point topology or star topology based on the IEEE 802.15.4 protocol
    - Zigbee - standards-based mesh networking based on the Zigbee protocol
    - DigiMesh - sleeping mesh networking protocol developed by Digi International
  - XBee Series 2 (mature family, not recommended for new designs)
    - 802.15.4 / Zigbee / DigiMesh (see descriptions above)
- Long Range (900/868 MHz)
  - XBee SX 900 / 868
    - point-to-point topology, star topology or mesh networking based on DigiMesh protocol
    - High power (up to 1-Watt) for extreme RF line-of-sight range up to 105 km (65 miles)
    - Low power (+13 dBm / 20 mW) for EU and battery-optimized applications
  - XBee 868LP/900HP
    - point-to-point topology, star topology or mesh networking based on DigiMesh protocol
- Cellular / LPWAN
  - XBee 3 LTE Cat-1
  - XBee 3 LTE-M / NB-IoT
  - XBee 3G

== See also ==
- Bluetooth
- Zigbee
- LTE-M
- Narrowband IoT
- Comparison of wireless data standards
