= Make (magazine) =

American DIY magazine (2005-)

- Categories: Do it yourself (DIY)
- Frequency: Quarterly
- Founder: Dale Dougherty
- First issue: February 2005
- Company: Make: Community, LLC.
- Country: United States
- Based in: Santa Rosa, California
- Language: English
- Website: makezine.com
- ISSN: 1556-2336

Make (stylized as Make: or MAKE:) is an American magazine published since February 2005 which focuses on do it yourself (DIY) projects for individuals and groups, involving computers, electronics, metalworking, robotics, woodworking and other disciplines. The magazine is marketed to people who enjoyed making things and features complex projects which can often be completed with cheap materials, including household items. Make has been described as "a central organ of the maker movement".

In June 2019, Make magazine's parent company, Maker Media, abruptly shut down the bimonthly magazine due to lack of financial resources. It was subsequently reorganized and began publishing quarterly issues, starting with volume 70 in October 2019. Make Magazine is currently published by Make Community LLC.

== History and profile ==
The magazine's first issue was released in February 2005 and then published as a quarterly in the months of February, May, August, and November; as of Fall 2023, 86 issues have been published. It is also available in a digital edition.

The magazine has features and rotating columns, but the emphasis is on step-by-step projects. Each issue also features a Toolbox section with reviews of books and tools. Most volumes had a theme to which the articles in the special section are usually related. Columnists have included Cory Doctorow, Lee D. Zlotoff, Mister Jalopy, and Bruce Sterling. The cartoonist Roy Doty has also contributed to many issues of the magazine.

Make's founder and publisher is O'Reilly co-founder Dale Dougherty along with Sherry Huss. The founding editor-in-chief was Mark Frauenfelder. The current editor-in-chief is Keith Hammond.

In Germany, Austria and Switzerland, the Heise Zeitschriften Verlag was under license to publish a German-language edition of Make independently of the English-language one. Maker Media GmbH produced and published the magazine every other month.

A time-lapse video of the Make robot logo being 3D printed on a RepRapPro Fisher printer

== Maker Faire ==
The magazine launched a public annual event to "celebrate arts, crafts, engineering, science projects and the Do-It-Yourself (DIY) mindset." Called Maker Faire, the first was held April 22–23, 2006, at the San Mateo Fairgrounds. It included six exposition and workshop pavilions, a 5-acre (20,000 m^{2}) outdoor midway, over 100 exhibiting makers, hands-on workshops, demonstrations, and DIY competitions.

In 2007, Maker Faire was held in the San Francisco Bay Area on May 3–4, and Austin, Texas, on October 20–21. The 2008 Maker Faires occurred May 3–4 at the San Mateo Fairgrounds in San Mateo, California, and October 18–19 at the Travis County Expo Center in Austin, Texas. The 2009 Maker Faire Bay Area was held on May 30–31. In 2010, there were three Maker Faires: Bay Area on May 22–23, Detroit on July 31 and August 1, and New York on September 25–26.

By 2013, there were 100 Maker Faires across the globe, including in China, Japan, Israel, Australia, Spain, the UK, Italy, Ireland, Scotland, Chile, France, Norway, Canada, Germany and the Netherlands, as well as numerous cities in the United States. A total of 93 of these Faires were "Mini" Maker Faires — smaller scale, independently produced, local events.

In 2014, a Maker Faire was hosted by the White House. In 2017, more than 240 Maker Faires were planned.

== Makers ==
Makers (subtitled "All Kinds of People Making Amazing Things in Backyards, Garages, and Basements") is a spin-off hardback book. Based on the magazine section of the same name, it covers DIY projects and profiles their creators.

== Craft ==
In October 2006, a spin-off magazine, Craft, was created for art and craft activities, allowing Make to concentrate exclusively on technology and DIY projects. In February 2009, e-mails were sent to Craft: subscribers announcing that due to rising production costs and shrinking ad markets, the print version of Craft: would be discontinued but would remain as an online presence. All further printed content would be incorporated into Make.

== Make television ==
Make television is a television show produced by Twin Cities Public Television and hosted by John Edgar Park which premiered in January 2009 on PBS stations. Ten episodes of the show were produced, featuring projects and informational guides as well as user-produced videos which were submitted online.

== Make Controller Kit ==
The Make Controller Kit was an open-source hardware solution for hobbyists and professionals to create interactive applications. It supported desktop interfaces via a variety of languages such as Max/MSP, Flash, Processing, Java, Python, Ruby, or anything that supports OpenSound Control.

== See also ==
- Instructables
- Tim O'Reilly
- Makerspace
- Fab lab
