= ATtiny microcontroller comparison chart =

Subfamily of 8-bit AVR microcontrollers

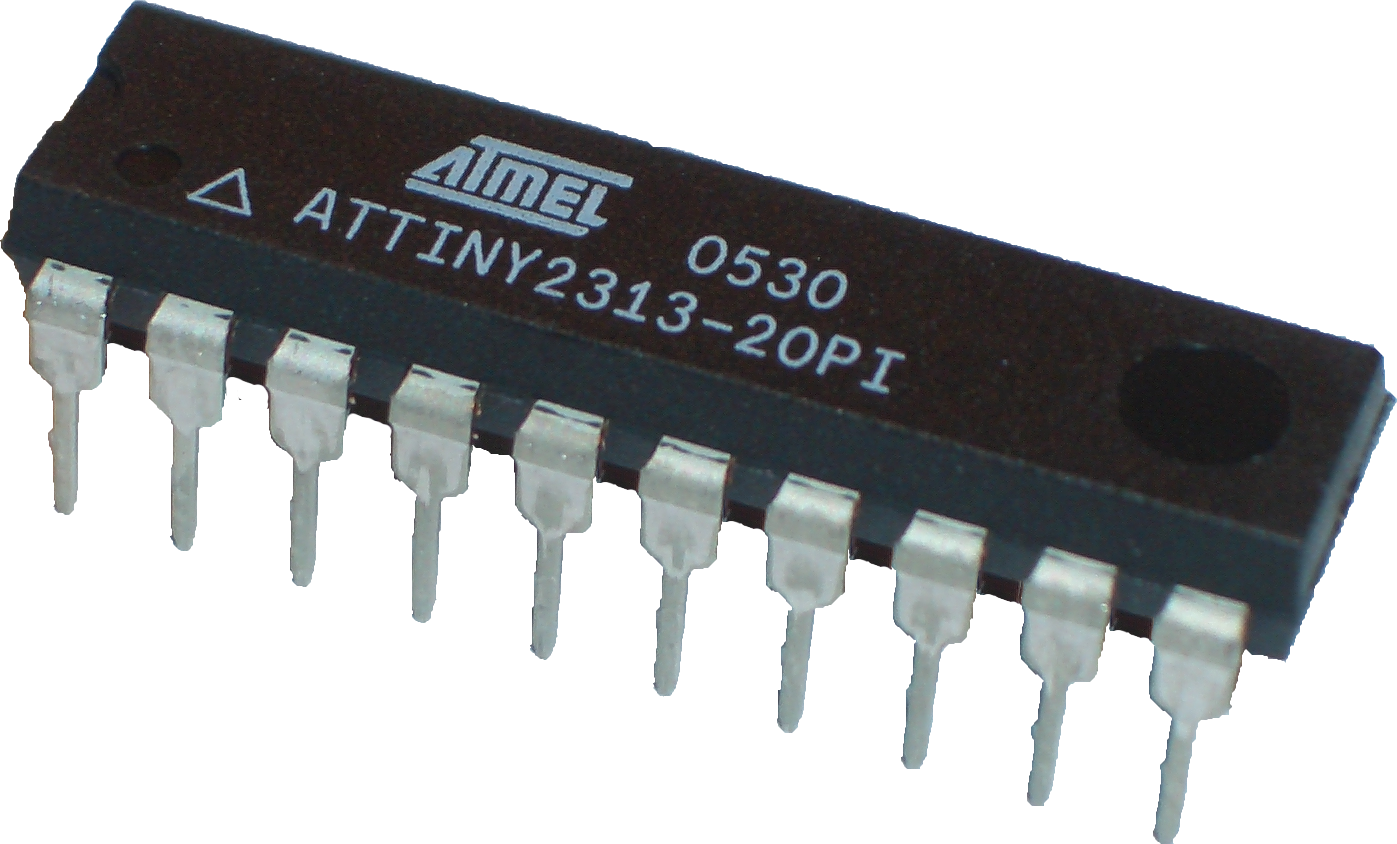
ATtiny2313 in 20-pin narrow dual in-line package (DIP-20N)

ATtiny, also known as TinyAVR, is a subfamily of the popular 8-bit AVR microcontrollers, which typically has fewer features, fewer I/O pins, and less memory than other AVR series chips. The first members of this family were released in 1999 by Atmel (later acquired by Microchip Technology in 2016).

== Features ==
ATtiny microcontrollers specifically exclude various common features, such as: USB peripheral, DMA controller, crypto engine, or an external memory bus.

The following table summarizes common features of the ATtiny microcontrollers, for easy comparison. This table is not meant to be an unabridged feature list.

Device (family)	Max clock (MHz)	Flash (KiB)	SRAM (bytes)	EEPROM (bytes)	USART (UART)	I²C (TWI)	SPI	Timers 16/12/8 (bits)	ADC pins	GPIO pins	IC Packages	GCC arch ID	Pgm Dbg	Refs
ATtiny11, ATtiny11L	6, 2	1	No	No	No	No	No	0 / 0 / 1	No	5	DIP-8N, SO200-8	avr1	HVSP	
ATtiny12, ATtiny12L, ATtiny12V	8, 1.2	1	No	64	No	No	No	0 / 0 / 1	No	5	DIP-8N, SO200-8	avr1	ISP, HVSP	
ATtiny15L	1.6	1	No	64	No	No	No	0 / 0 / 2	4	6	DIP-8N, SO200-8	avr1	ISP, HVSP	
ATtiny28L, ATtiny28V	4, 1.2	2	No	No	No	No	No	0 / 0 / 1	No	11	DIP-28N, TQFP-32, QFN-32	avr1	HVPP	
ATtiny22, ATtiny22L	8, 4	2	128	128	No	No	No	0 / 0 / 1	No	5	DIP-8N, SO200-8	avr2	ISP, HVSP	
ATtiny26, ATtiny26L	16, 8	2	128	128	USI*	master, slave*	master, slave*	0 / 0 / 2	11	16	DIP-20N, SO300-20, QFN-32	avr2	ISP, HVPP	
ATtiny13, ATtiny13V, ATtiny13A	20, 10	1	64	64	No	No	No	0 / 0 / 1	4	6	DIP-8N, SO150-8, SO209-8, VQFN-10, WQFN-20	avr25	ISP, dW, HVSP	
ATtiny24, ATtiny24V, ATtiny24A, ATtiny44, ATtiny44V, ATtiny44A, ATtiny84, ATtiny84V, ATtiny84A	20, 10	2, 4, 8	128, 256, 512	128, 256, 512	USI*	master, slave*	master, slave*	1 / 0 / 1	8	12	DIP-14N, SO150-14, QFN-20, VQFN-20, UFBGA-15	avr25	ISP, dW, HVSP	
ATtiny25, ATtiny25V, ATtiny45, ATtiny45V, ATtiny85, ATtiny85V	20, 10	2, 4, 8	128, 256, 512	128, 256, 512	USI*	master, slave*	master, slave*	0 / 0 / 2 (Note: timer0 can use clocks up to the core clock, timer1 can use clocks up to 64MHz)	4	6	DIP-8N, SO208-8, TSSOP-8, QFN-20	avr25	ISP, dW, HVSP	
ATtiny43U (Note: Ultra-low voltage model with integrated boost converter that can be powered with only 0.7 volts.)	8	4	256	64	USI*	master, slave*	master, slave*	0 / 0 / 2	4	16	SO300-20, QFN-20	avr25	ISP, dW, HVPP	
ATtiny48, ATtiny88	12	4, 8	256, 512	64	No	master, slave	master, slave	1 / 0 / 1	6	24	DIP-28N, QFN-28	avr25	ISP, dW, HVPP	
ATtiny48, ATtiny88	12	4, 8	256, 512	64	No	master, slave	master, slave	1 / 0 / 1	8	28	TQFP-32, QFN-32, UFBGA-32	avr25	ISP, dW, HVPP	
ATtiny87, ATtiny167	16	8, 16	512	512	USI*, UART*	No	master, slave	1 / 0 / 1	11	16	SO300-20, TSSOP-20, VQFN-32	avr25, avr35	ISP, dW, HVPP	
ATtiny261, ATtiny261A, ATtiny461, ATtiny461A, ATtiny861, ATtiny861A	20	2, 4, 8	128, 256, 512	128, 256, 512	USI*	master, slave*	master, slave*	1 / 0 / 1 (Note: timer/counter1 is a 10-bit counter that can use clocks to 64MHz.)	11	16	DIP-20N, SO300-20, TSSOP-20, QFN-32	avr25	ISP, dW, HVPP	
ATtiny441, ATtiny841	16	4, 8	256, 512	256, 512	2 USART*	slave	master, slave	2 / 0 / 1	12	12	SO150-14, QFN-20, VQFN-20	avr25	ISP, dW, HVSP	
ATtiny828	20	8	512	256	USART*	slave	master, slave	1 / 0 / 1	28	28	TQFP-32, QFN-32	avr25	ISP, dW, HVPP	
ATtiny1634	12	16	1024	256	USI*, 2 USART*	slave	master*	1 / 0 / 1	12	18	SO300-20, QFN-20	avr35	ISP, dW, HVPP	
ATtiny2313, ATtiny2313V, ATtiny2313A, ATtiny4313	20	2, 4	128, 256	128, 256	USI*, USART*	master, slave*	master, slave*	1 / 0 / 1	No	18	DIP-20N, SO300-20, VQFN-20	avr25	ISP, dW, HVPP	
ATtiny4, ATtiny5, ATtiny9, ATtiny10	12	0.5 / 1	32	No	No	No	No	1 / 0 / 0	4 (Note: ADC only on ATtiny5/10, and channels are 8 bits instead of 10)	4	SOT23-6, UDFN-8	avrtiny	TPI	
ATtiny20	12	2	128	No	No	slave	master, slave	1 / 0 / 1	8	12	SO150-14, TSSOP-14, VQFN-20, UFBGA-15, WLCSP-12	avrtiny	TPI	
ATtiny40	12	4	256	No	No	slave	master, slave	1 / 0 / 1	12	18	SO300-20, TSSOP-20, VQFN-20	avrtiny	TPI	
ATtiny102(F)	12	1	32	No	USART*	No	master*	1 / 0 / 0	5	6	SO150-8, UDFN-8	avrtiny	TPI	
ATtiny104(F)	12	1	32	No	USART*	No	master*	1 / 0 / 0	9	12	SO150-14	avrtiny	TPI	
ATtiny202, ATtiny402 (0-series)	20	2, 4	128, 256	64, 128	USART*	master, slave	master, slave	2 / 0 / 0 / RTT	6	6	SO150-8	avrxmega3	UPDI	
ATtiny204, ATtiny404, ATtiny804, ATtiny1604 (0-series)	20	2, 4, 8, 16	128, 256, 512, 1024	64, 128, 256	USART*	master, slave	master, slave	2 / 0 / 0 / RTT	10	12	SO150-14	avrxmega3	UPDI	
ATtiny406, ATtiny806, ATtiny1606 (0-series)	20	4, 8, 16	256, 512, 1024	128, 256	USART*	master, slave	master, slave	2 / 0 / 0 / RTT	12	18	SO300-20, VQFN-20	avrxmega3	UPDI	
ATtiny807, ATtiny1607 (0-series)	20	8, 16	512, 1024	128, 256	USART*	master, slave	master, slave	2 / 0 / 0 / RTT	12	22	VQFN-24	avrxmega3	UPDI	
ATtiny212, ATtiny412 (1-series)	20	2, 4	128, 256	64, 128	USART*	master, slave	master, slave	2 / 1 / 0 / RTT	6	6	SO150-8	avrxmega3	UPDI	
ATtiny214, ATtiny414, ATtiny814, ATtiny1614 (1-series)	20	2, 4, 8, 16	128, 256, 512, 2048	64, 128, 256	USART*	master, slave	master, slave	2 / 1 / 0 / RTT	10	12	SO150-14	avrxmega3	UPDI	
ATtiny416, ATtiny816, ATtiny1616, ATtiny3216 (1-series)	20	4, 8, 16, 32	256, 512, 2048	128, 256	USART*	master, slave	master, slave	2or3 / 1 / 0 / RTT	12	18	SO300-20, QFN-20, VQFN-20	avrxmega3	UPDI	
ATtiny417, ATtiny817, ATtiny1617, ATtiny3217 (1-series)	20	4, 8, 16, 32	256, 512, 2048	128, 256	USART*	master, slave	master, slave	2 / 1 / 0 / RTT	12	22	VQFN-24, QFN-24	avrxmega3	UPDI	
ATtiny424, ATtiny824, ATtiny1624, ATtiny3224 (2-series)	20	4, 8, 16, 32	512, 1024, 2048, 3072	128, 128, 256, 256	2 USART*	yes	yes	3 / 0 / 0 / RTT	9	12	SO-14, TSSOP-14	avrxmega3	UPDI	
ATtiny426, ATtiny826, ATtiny1626, ATtiny3226 (2-series)	20	4, 8, 16, 32	512, 1024, 2048, 3072	128, 128, 256, 256	2 USART*	yes	yes	3 / 0 / 0 / RTT	15	18	SO-20, SSTOP-20, VQFN-20	avrxmega3	UPDI	
ATtiny427, ATtiny827, ATtiny1627, ATtiny3227 (2-series)	20	4, 8, 16, 32	512, 1024, 2048, 3072	128, 128, 256, 256	2 USART*	yes	yes	3 / 0 / 0 / RTT	15	22	VQFN-24	avrxmega3	UPDI	
Device (family)	Max clock (MHz)	Flash (KiB)	SRAM (bytes)	EEPROM (bytes)	USART (UART)	I²C (TWI)	SPI	Timers 16/12/8/R (bits)	ADC pins	GPIO pins	IC Packages	GCC arch ID	Pgm Dbg	Refs

Notes

A watchdog timer (WDT, or simply a watchdog), sometimes called a computer operating properly timer (COP timer), is an electronic or software timer that is used to detect and recover from computer malfunctions. Watchdog timers are widely used in computers to facilitate automatic correction of temporary hardware faults, and to prevent errant or malevolent software from disrupting system operation.

During normal operation, the computer regularly restarts the watchdog timer to prevent it from elapsing, or timing out. If, due to a hardware fault or program error, the computer fails to restart the watchdog, the timer will elapse and generate a timeout signal. The timeout signal is used to initiate corrective actions. The corrective actions typically include placing the computer and associated hardware in a safe state and invoking a computer reboot.

Microcontrollers often include an integrated, on-chip watchdog. In other computers the watchdog may reside in a nearby chip that connects directly to the CPU, or it may be located on an external expansion card in the computer's chassis.

- Package column - the number after the dash is the number of pins on the package. DIP packages in this table are 0.3 inches (7.62 mm) row-to-row. SOwww means SOIC package with a case width of 'www' in thousandth of an inch. Though some package types are known by more than one name, a common name was chosen to make it easier to compare packages.
- UART/I²C/SPI columns - green cell means a dedicated peripheral, * yellow cell means a multi-feature peripheral that is chosen by setting configuration bits. Most USART peripherals support a minimum choice between UART or SPI, where as some might support additional choices, such as LIN, IrDA, RS-485.
- Timers column - more recent families have wider timers and may allow chaining two 16-bit timers to do 32-bit capture. RTT is a 16-bit Real Time Timer that is driven by a 32.768KHz clock, though Microchip calls it RTC for Real Time Counter (easily confused to mean Real Time Clock).
- ADC pins column - the total number of analog channels that are accessible via pins that multiplex into the ADC input. Most parts have one ADC, a few have two ADC.
- Pgm/Dbg column - flash programming and debugging protocols: HVPP means High Voltage Parallel Programming 12V protocol, HVSP means High Voltage Serial Programming 12V protocol, ISP means In-System Programmable protocol, uses SPI to program the internal flash. TPI is Tiny Programming Interface. dW means debugWIRE protocol. UPDI means Unified Program and Debug Interface protocol (newest).

Abbreviations

- TWI: Many of Atmels microcontrollers contain built-in support for interfacing to a two-wire bus, called Two-Wire Interface. This is essentially the same thing as the I²C interface by Philips, but that term is avoided in Atmel's documentation due to trademark issues.
- USI: Universal Serial Interface (not to be confused with USB). The USI is a multi-purpose hardware communication module. With appropriate software support, it can be used to implement an SPI, I²C or UART interface. USART peripherals have more features than USI peripherals.

== Timeline ==
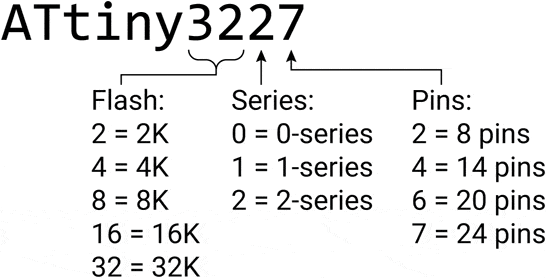
Newer parts use this naming convention

The following table lists each ATtiny microcontroller by the first release date of each datasheet.

Year	Device (family)
1999	ATtiny11, ATtiny11L, ATtiny12, ATtiny12L, ATtiny12V, ATtiny22, ATtiny22L
2002	ATtiny15L, ATtiny26, ATtiny26L, ATtiny28L, ATtiny28V
2003	ATtiny13, ATtiny13V, ATtiny2313, ATtiny2313V, ATtiny4313
2005	ATtiny24, ATtiny24V, ATtiny25, ATtiny25V, ATtiny44, ATtiny44V, ATtiny45, ATtiny45V, ATtiny84, ATtiny84V, ATtiny85, ATtiny85V
2006	ATtiny261, ATtiny461, ATtiny861
2008	ATtiny13A, ATtiny24A, ATtiny44A, ATtiny48, ATtiny84A, ATtiny88
2009	ATtiny4, ATtiny5, ATtiny9, ATtiny10, ATtiny43U, ATtiny261A, ATtiny461A, ATtiny861A, ATtiny2313A
2010	ATtiny20, ATtiny40, ATtiny87, ATtiny167
2011	ATtiny1634
2012	ATtiny441, ATtiny841, ATtiny828
2016	ATtiny102(F), ATtiny104(F), ATtiny417, ATtiny817
2017	ATtiny212, ATtiny412, ATtiny214, ATtiny414, ATtiny814, ATtiny416, ATtiny816
2018	ATtiny202, ATtiny402, ATtiny204, ATtiny404, ATtiny804, ATtiny1604, ATtiny406, ATtiny806, ATtiny1606, ATtiny807, ATtiny1607, ATtiny1614, ATtiny1616, ATtiny3216, ATtiny1617, ATtiny3217
2020	ATtiny1624, ATtiny1626, ATtiny1627
2021	ATtiny424, ATtiny824, ATtiny426, ATtiny826, ATtiny427, ATtiny827

== Development boards ==
The following are ATtiny development boards sold by Microchip Technology:

- ATtiny104 Xplained Nano
- ATtiny416 Xplained Nano
- ATtiny817 AVR Parrot
- ATtiny817 Xplained Mini
- ATtiny817 Xplained Pro
- ATtiny3217 Xplained Pro

== See also ==
- AVR microcontrollers
- Atmel AVR instruction set
- In-system programming
- Arduino
