= Single-board =

Single-board may refer to:

- Single-board computer, a complete computer built on a single circuit board
- Single-board microcontroller, a microcontroller pre-built onto a single printed circuit board
