= DebugWIRE =

Communication protocol for on-chip debugging

debugWIRE is a serial communications protocol, designed by Atmel. It is used for on-chip debugging of AVR microcontrollers.

== Protocol ==
debugWIRE is designed as a simpler alternative to JTAG, aimed at microcontrollers (MCUs) with limited resources. It is supported by the classic ATtiny and some smaller ATmega MCUs, such as the ATmega328. By using debugWIRE one has full read and write access to all memory and full control over the execution flow. It supports single-step, run-to-cursor, step-out, and software break instructions. A breakpoint (run-to-cursor) will be set by reprogramming the BREAK opcode into the flash memory of the MCU. Care must be taken due to the limited number of guaranteed write cycles (10000) of the device. To avoid reprogramming the flash use single-step or run-to-cursor which will use the single hardware breakpoint.

== Programmer models ==
debugWIRE is supported by all modern hardware debuggers from Microchip. This includes Atmel-ICE, JTAGICE3, AVR Dragon, JTAGICE mkII, and SNAP. It is also possible to build a cheap debugWIRE hardware debugger based on an open-source Arduino sketch, using a general USB-Serial adaptor or ATtiny85 board, or a CH552 microcontroller.

== debugWIRE specifications ==
debugWIRE is activated by setting (programming to zero) of the fuse DWEN (debugWIRE enable), normally located in the high fuse byte. After this action the /RESET pin function isn't available anymore and the ISP protocol cannot be used. debugWIRE can be disabled with any of the mentioned debuggers by sending a special reset command that disables temporarily the debugWIRE function and reenables /RESET and also ISP until next power down cycle. debugWIRE is not able to program the fuses of a device. If you want to disable debugWIRE permanently you have to disable the function temporarily and program the fuse using the now available ISP function. debugWIRE uses a 1 wire open drain serial connection. The default baud rate used is MCU clock/128. Sending a BREAK will return 0x55 which is used to detect the baud rate. The MCU will return a BREAK when a breakpoint is hit or a collision is detected on the debugWIRE connection. 0x06 is used to disable debugWIRE and reenable /RESET and ISP, 0x07 resets the MCU, 0xF0 returns the PC, 0xF3 the debugWIRE ID.
