= BasicX =

Programming language

BasicX is a free programming language designed specifically for NetMedia's BX-24 microcontroller and based on the BASIC programming language. It is used in the design of robotics projects such as the Robodyssey Systems Mouse robot.
