= Wiring (software) =

Open-source prototyping platform

- Developers: Hernando Barragán, Brett Hagman, Alexander Brevig
- Release: 2007; 19 years ago
- Final release: 1.0 (0101) / 28 October 2014; 11 years ago
- Operating system: Linux, macOS, Windows
- Type: Software framework, integrated development environment
- License: LGPL or GPL
- Website: wiring.org.co
- Repository: github.com/WiringProject/Wiring

Wiring is an electronics prototyping computing platform composed of a programming language, an integrated development environment (IDE), and a single-board microcontroller. It was developed starting in 2003 by Hernando Barragán. It is free and open-source software released under a GNU Lesser General Public License (LGPL) or GNU General Public License (GPL).

Barragán began the project at the Interaction Design Institute Ivrea. As of 2014, the project is developed at the School of Architecture and Design at the University of the Andes (Universidad de Los Andes) in Bogotá, Colombia.

Wiring builds on Processing, an open project initiated by Casey Reas and Benjamin Fry, both formerly of the Aesthetics and Computation Group at the MIT Media Lab.

Project experts, intermediate developers, and beginners from around the world share ideas, knowledge and their collective experience as a project community. Wiring makes it easy to create software for controlling devices attached to the electronics board to create various interactive devices. The concept of developing is to write a few lines of code, connect a few electronic components to the Wiring hardware and observe, for example, that a motion sensor controls a light when a person approaches it, write a few more lines, add another sensor, and see how this light changes when the illumination level in a room decreases. This process is called sketching with hardware; explore ideas quickly, select the more interesting ones, refine and produce prototypes in an iterative process.

== Software ==
The Wiring IDE is a cross-platform software application written in Java which is derived from the IDE made for the Processing programming language. It is designed to introduce programming and sketching with electronics to artists and designers. It includes a code editor with features such as syntax highlighting, brace matching, and automatic indenting that can compile and upload programs to the board with one click.

The Wiring IDE includes a C and C++ library named Wiring, which makes common input/output operations much easier. Wiring programs are written in C++. A minimal program requires only two functions:

- setup(): a function run once at the start of a program which can be used to define initial environment settings.
- loop(): a function called repeatedly until the board is powered off or reset.

A typical first program for a developer using a microcontroller is to blink a light-emitting diode (LED) on and off. In the Wiring environment, the user might write a program like this:

int ledPin = WLED;               // a name for the on-board LED

void setup () {
   pinMode(ledPin, OUTPUT);      // configure the pin for digital output
}

void loop () {
   digitalWrite(ledPin, HIGH);   // turn on the LED
   delay (1000);                 // wait one second (1000 milliseconds)
   digitalWrite(ledPin, LOW);    // turn off the LED
   delay (1000);                 // wait one second
}

When the user clicks the "Upload to Wiring hardware" button in the IDE, a copy of the code is written to a temporary file including a standard header file at the file start, and a simple main function appended.

The Wiring IDE uses the GNU toolchain and AVR Libc to compile programs, and uses avrdude to upload programs to the board.

== Open-source hardware and software ==
The Wiring hardware reference designs are distributed under a Creative Commons Attribution Share-Alike 2.5 license and are available on the Wiring Web site. Layout and production files for the Wiring hardware are also available. The source code for the IDE and the hardware library are available and released under the GPLv2.

== See also ==
- Arduino
- BASIC Stamp
- Fritzing
- Gumstix
- Make Controller Kit
- OOPic
- PICAXE
- Processing
- Rabbit Semiconductor
- Tinkerforge

== Sources ==
- Reas, Casey; Fry, Ben; Maeda, John (September 30, 2007). Processing: A Programming Handbook for Visual Designers and Artists (1st ed.). The MIT Press. p. 736. ISBN 978-0-262-18262-1. Archived from the original on April 17, 2011.
- Igoe, Tom (September 28, 2007). Making Things Talk: Practical Methods for Connecting Physical Objects (1st ed.). O'Reilly Media. p. 432. ISBN 978-0-596-51051-0.
- Noble, Joshua (July 15, 2009). Programming Interactivity: A Designer's Guide to Processing, Arduino, and openFramework (1st ed.). O'Reilly Media. p. 768. ISBN 978-0-596-15414-1.
