= Arduboy =

Handheld video game console

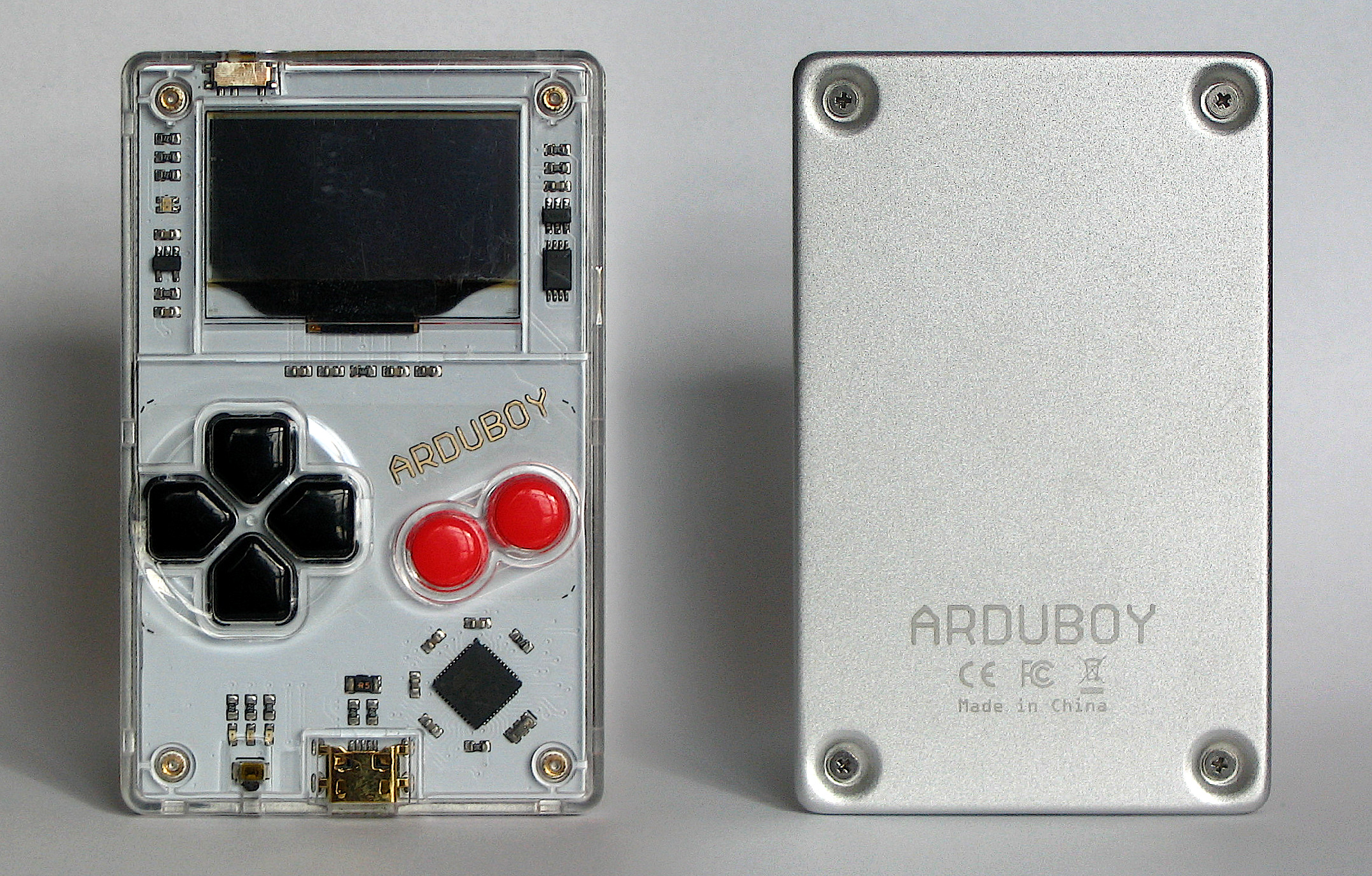
- Arduboy in the front and back
- Also known as: Bateske Arduboy, Arduboy FX/FX-C
- Developer: Kevin Bates
- Type: Handheld video game console
- Introductory price: $29 (Arduboy) $54 (Arduboy FX) $79 (Arduboy FX-C)
- Media: Digital distribution
- CPU: ATMega32u4
- Memory: 2.5 KB
- Storage: 32 KB (Arduboy)
- Display: 1.3" 128x64px 1-bit OLED
- Sound: Stereo piezo speakers
- Connectivity: microUSB
- Power: Rechargeable 180mAh battery
- Platform: Arduino
- Marketing target: DIY, education, programming
- Successor: Arduboy FX/FX-C
- Website: arduboy.com
- Language: C, C++

The Arduboy is a handheld game console with open source software, based on the Arduino hardware platform.

== History ==
=== Development ===
The original version of the Arduboy was 1.6 millimetres (0.063 in) thick, with the height and width of a credit card, and was initially designed by Kevin Bates, an American Arduino enthusiast, as an electronic business card.

In preparation for a consumer version, the developer moved to Shenzhen to work on the Arduboy at the HAX accelerator.

Later consumer versions replaced the first version's touch-sensitive panels with physical buttons, and include a protective plastic case, raising the thickness to 5 millimetres (0.20 in).

A non-production smaller form factor "Arduboy Mini" was demonstrated in 2019. Another non-production system, the "Arduboy Nano" was demonstrated in 2021 with a smaller form factor than the Arduboy Mini.

=== Consumer versions ===
A Kickstarter campaign was being planned in 2014. Development was funded through a Kickstarter campaign in 2015. The launch price of the original Arduboy was either $29 or $39.

In August 2020, Arduboy announced 'Arduboy FX', an upgraded version that includes a flash memory chip that stores over 250 games on the device itself. This version shipped around 2021 at a price of $54.

In November 2025, an updated revision of the FX came out. Dubbed the 'Arduboy FX-C', it featured over 100 additional games, a USB-C port, and multiplayer support via link cable. The Arduboy FX-C launched at a price of $79.

=== Tetris Microcard ===
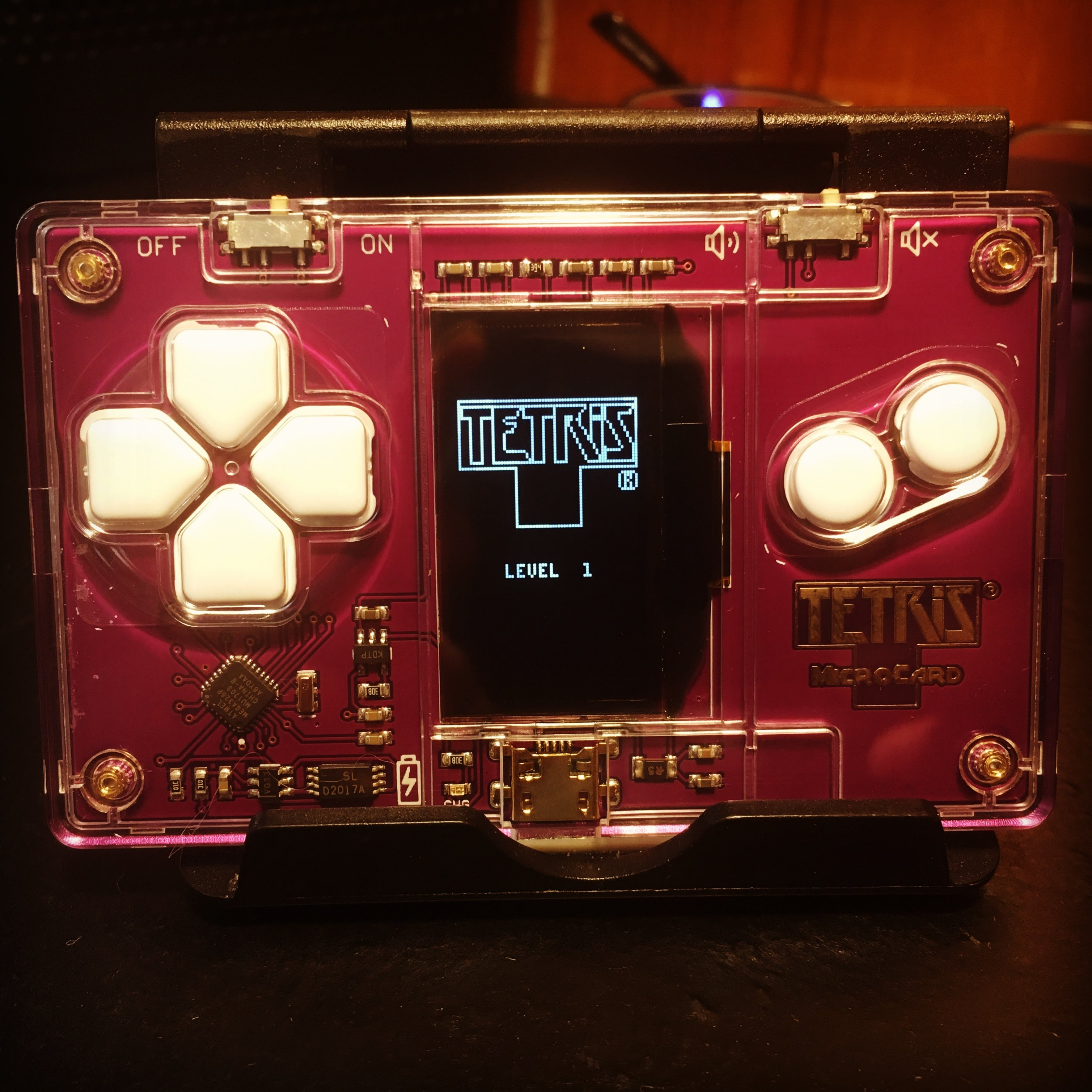
Arduboy-based Tetris MicroCard

As well as the open-source Arduboy itself, a single-game version featuring an officially licensed (non-open) version of Tetris is also available.

== Hardware ==
The Arduboy is open-source hardware.

The compute platform of the Arduboy is based on that of the Arduino. Both the Arduboy and Arduboy FX/FX-C use an 8-bit ATMega32u4 microcontroller as the primary processor, RAM, and storage device of the system. The system ships with 2.5 kilobytes of RAM.

The Arduboy has 32 kilobytes of flash storage, as well as 1 kilobytes of EEPROM. The Arduboy FX/FX-C features additional storage through the use of an official modchip, installed either from the factory or aftermarket.

The system uses a 1-bit 1.3 inches (33 mm) 128x64px OLED display.

Audio is handled by stereophonic piezoelectric speakers.

The system is powered for about 5-8 hours on a rechargeable thin-film lithium polymer battery with a capacity of 180 mAh. The Arduboy and Arduboy FX have a microUSB connector, with the Arduboy FX-C being the only model with a USB-C connector. The console can also be used as a simple controller or input device for other systems.

Casing is made from both aluminium and polycarbonate.
