= XOD (programming language) =

- Paradigms: Declarative, dataflow, functional reactive, visual
- Developer: XOD Inc
- First appeared: 2016; 9 years ago
- Stable release: 0.38.0 / March 12, 2021; 4 years ago
- Platform: Arduino, Raspberry Pi
- License: GNU Affero General Public License 3.0
- Website: xod.io

XOD is a visual programming language for microcontrollers, started in 2016. As a supported platform, XOD started with Arduino boards compatibility and Raspberry Pi. It is free and open-source software released under the GNU Affero General Public License, version 3.0.

== Basics ==
The basic elements of XOD programming are nodes. XOD is based on functional reactive programming principles and provides graphical flow-based application programming interface. XOD can compile a native machine code for the low-ended controllers. A node is a block that represents either some physical device like a sensor, motor, or relay, or some operation such as addition, comparison, or text concatenation. XOD is also able to let the user build up some missing node using other nodes, without switching to textual programming.

=== Analogs ===
Node-RED and NoFlo are the closest analogs of XOD.
