= RoboBlockly =

Web-based robot simulation environment

RoboBlocky (formerly RoboBlockly) is a web-based robot simulation environment for learning coding and math. Based on Blockly, it uses a simple puzzle-piece interface to program virtual Linkbot, Lego Mindstorms NXT and EV3, as well as to draw and animate for beginners to learn robotics, coding, math, science, and art. Blocks in RoboBlocky can be executed in debug mode step-by-step. All math activities in RoboBlocky are Common Core State Standards Mathematics compliant.

RoboBlocky is a project of the UC Davis Integration Engineering Laboratory and UC Davis Center for Integrated Computing and STEM Education (C-STEM). It is a part of the C-STEM Studio. RoboBlocky is provided free of charge.

RoboBlockly, Hour Of Code

RoboBlocky prepares students ready to program in Ch, C, and C++. The saved Ch code from RoboBlocky can be readily run without any modification in Ch, a C/C++ interpreter, to control hardware Linkbot and Lego Mindstorms NXT/EV3, or virtual Linkbot and NXT/EV3 in C-STEM Studio.

Users can share ideas and creations with the RoboBlocky user community through RoboBlocky Activity Portal.

RoboBlocky can run in any modern browser, without installation of any software, independent of operating system and device. It supports Web browsers IE, Edge, Firefox, Chrome, Safari, in platforms of desktops, tablets, and smartphones with Windows, Mac, iOS, Android, etc.
