= C-STEM Center =

STEM program by University of California

C-STEM (Center for Integrated Computing and STEM Education) is a UC-approved educational preparation program for undergraduate admission for UC campuses to prepare students for college and career. C-STEM has University of California A-G Program status. High schools can add the A-G approved C-STEM curriculum to their own school’s A-G course lists for the UC/CSU admission requirements.

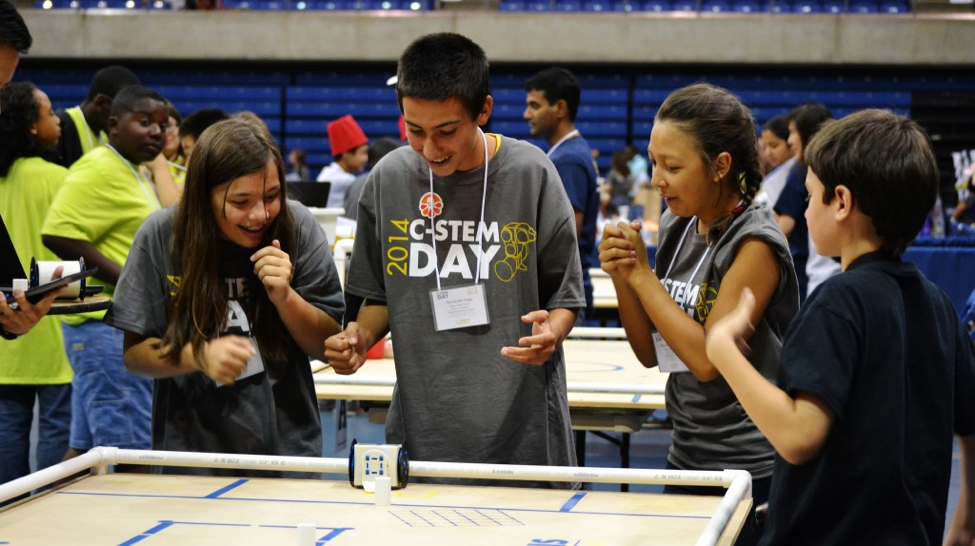

The C-STEM center is located on the University of California, Davis, campus. The Center aims to transform computing, science, technology, engineering, and mathematics (C-STEM) education in both formal and informal K-14 programs through integrated learning, guided by two key objectives:

- Close the achievement gap by broadening participation of students traditionally underrepresented in computing and STEM related careers and post-secondary study.
- Develop students’ 21st century problem-solving skills through integrated computing and STEM education.

The C-STEM Center has developed educational technology C-STEM Studio and RoboBlockly with computing in C/C++ for K-14 hands-on integrated learning. C-STEM Studio is a platform for teaching computing, science, technology, engineering and mathematics with robotics (Barobo Linkbot, Lego Mindstorms NXT, EV3, and Arduino boards). RoboBlockly is a web-based robot simulation for learning coding and math. The Center has also developed integrated C-STEM curriculum that integrates computing and robotics into Common Core compliant math courses with coding and math activities for grades 1 through 9.

The vision of the C-STEM is to provide formal computing education for all K–12 students. C-STEM ICT Pathway provides 12-years computer science education for K–12 students. The Pathway includes robotics and math with coding activities in RoboBlockly and C/C++ for elementary school students, rigorous Computer Programming course for middle school students, and Computer Programming courses and AP Computer Science Principles for high school students.

The C-STEM Center studies the use of innovative computing and robotics technologies to increase student interest, with an emphasis on Algebra. The C-STEM program tries to close the achievement gap, engages traditionally unrepresented groups and at risk students in learning STEM subjects. The C-STEM Center provides C-STEM 2-Day Academy, On-Site Training, 1-Week Institute, and Train-the-Trainer program to integrate computing and robotics into their classroom teaching.

== C-STEM Day ==
The annual C-STEM Day is organized to build public awareness and advocate for Integrated Computing and STEM education. The C-STEM Center and its partners organize curriculum-based RoboPlay Competitions on C-STEM Day, typically held at the end of May each year, to further engage students in project-based team activities and to showcase their accomplishments and creativity in math, engineering, writing, art, music and film production. Various C-STEM awards and scholarships are presented at the awards ceremonies to students to recognize their achievements.

== C-STEM Girls in Robotics Leadership (GIRL) Camps ==
The one-week GIRL Camps in summer are aimed to inspire girls in middle school to pursue computing and STEM-related careers and post-secondary studies through near-peer mentoring with robotics activities. The girls also meet female leaders working in science and technology.

== C-STEM Annual Conference ==
The annual C-STEM Conference on Integrated Computing and STEM Education provides a forum for educators to discuss, share their views, and experiences about the educational landscape, as well as issues related to integrated learning in computing and STEM education.
