= Hernando Barragán =

Colombian designer

- Born: 1974 (age 51–52)
- Known for: Wiring, Arduino
- Awards: BID 2010, II Bienal Iberoamericana de Diseño
- Website: barraganstudio.com

Hernando Barragán (born 1974) is a Colombian interdisciplinary artist, designer, and academic known for creating the Wiring programming language and integrated development environment (development platform) as his 2003 Master's degree thesis project at the Interaction Design Institute Ivrea (IDII) in Italy. The Arduino project is based on Wiring. He is currently an educator at the University of the Andes (Colombia).

== Career ==
Barragán graduated with a degree in computer science from the University of the Andes (Colombia), in Spanish Universidad de los Andes, in Bogotá, Colombia. He then studied interaction design at the IDII in Ivrea, Italy where he developed Wiring, an open-source electronics prototyping platform as his master's thesis which earned him a Master's of Art with distinction degree. His thesis advisors were Casey Reas and Massimo Banzi. Banzi eventually co-created the Arduino electronics prototyping platform and based its programming language on the Wiring language. Wiring builds on the Processing language developed by Casey Reas and Ben Fry at the MIT Media Lab. Wiring has inspired other electronics prototyping platforms such as Energia. In 2013 Ed Baafi, founder of Modkit declared Wiring “the future of microcontroller programming” during the Sketching in Hardware 2013 conference in PARC in Palo Alto, California. On May 19, 2017, Barragán was named Arduino Chief Design Architect.

Barragán was part of the “Easy as a kiss: Humanizing technology through design Vision, story and impact of Interaction Design Institute Ivrea” exhibition curated by Gillian Crampton-Smith in the Circolo del Design in Turin, Italy from May 7 to September 19, 2021.

As of 2021, he is a tenured professor, and dean of the School of Architecture and Design at the Universidad de los Andes.
