= PMP =

PMP may refer to:

== Biology and chemistry ==
- Plant-made pharmaceuticals or Pharming
- p-Methoxyphenyl, a protecting group for amines
- Polymethylpentene, a type of plastic
- Pempidine, systematic name 1,2,2,6,6-pentamethylpiperidine
- Pyridoxamine phosphate, a form of vitamin B_{6}

== Medicine ==
- Phenoxymethylpenicillin
- Prescription monitoring program
- Pseudomyxoma peritonei, a cancer

== Business ==
- Denel PMP, company division
- Project Management Professional, a certification

== Technology ==
- NAT-PMP, NAT Port Mapping Protocol
- Pic Micro Pascal, Pascal compiler for PICs
- Point-to-multipoint communication, in telecommunications
- Portable media player, for digital media

== Politics ==
- Parliamentary Monarchist Party, Burundi
- People's Monarchist Party (Italy)
- People's Movement Party, Romania
- Pwersa ng Masang Pilipino, Philippines

== Transport ==
- Plumpton railway station, a railway station in Sussex, England

== Other uses ==
- Perlman Music Program, Shelter Island, New York, US
- PMP Floating Bridge, a Soviet mobile pontoon bridge
- Pompano Beach Airpark, IATA and FAA codes
- Poor Man's Poison, American folk band
- Proto-Malayo-Polynesian language
- Pontryagin's maximum principle, in mathematics
- Prison Mathematics Project
