= Steve Sanghi =

Indian businessman

- Born: Steve Sanghi; July 20, 1955 (age 71); Sri Muktsar Sahib, Punjab, India
- Education: Punjab Engineering College (BS); University of Massachusetts Amherst (MS)
- Occupation: Businessman
- Known for: President & CEO of Microchip Technology
- Spouse: Maria Sanghi
- Children: 2

Steve Sanghi is an Indian-American businessman who is currently the president and chief executive officer of Microchip Technology. He also serves as chairman of the board of directors and is a member of the Mellanox Technologies and Intel boards of directors.

He previously served as president of Microchip Technology from 1990 to 2016 and as chief executive officer from 1991 to 2021, and was re-appointed to both roles in November 2024.

== Early life and education ==
Sanghi was born on July 20, 1955 in Sri Muktsar Sahib, India. His father was a judge while his mother stayed at home and raised the family.

He attended Asa Ram Senior Secondary School in Ambala. He received his bachelor of science in electronics and communication from the Punjab Engineering College in 1975 and his masters of science in electrical and computer engineering from the University of Massachusetts Amherst.

== Career ==
Sanghi began his career at Intel as an engineer, and quickly rose through the ranks, eventually becoming the general manager of their programmable memory products division. In 1988, Sanghi became vice president of operations at a start-up called Waferscale Integration before joining Microchip in February 1990, which at the time was on the brink of bankruptcy.

In August 1990, he was appointed a director as well as company president. In 1993, he was made chairman of the board. In 1991, he was also appointed chief executive officer. Sanghi is credited with making Microchip profitable again. Under his leadership, the company invested in research and development, which allowed them to create new products. He also emphasized company culture, and worked to create a culture of team work and employee input.

Sanghi served as president until February 2016, when he was replaced by Ganesh Moorthy. He served as CEO until March 2021, when Moorthy took over that role as well. He stayed on as chairman of the board, and holds the role to this day. In November 2024, Moorthy announced his retirement, and Sanghi was reappointed president and CEO.

Sanghi won the Dr. Morris Chang Exemplary Leadership Award from the Global Semiconductor Alliance in December 2022. In October 2024, Northern Arizona University renamed their College of Engineering, Informatics, and Applied Sciences to the Steve Sanghi College of Engineering. In 2026, Sanghi named the NAU College of Nursing, the Maria and Steve Sanghi College of Nursing.

In December 2024, Sanghi was appointed to the Intel board of directors.

== Personal life ==
Sanghi is married to Maria and together they have two children, Christie and Jason. In 2017, they purchased the most expensive home ever sold in Arizona, in the town of Paradise Valley, for $15.6 million.

He wrote a book about his life and career called Up and to the Right in early 2023, and in October 2024, he released Ask Steve, a collection of advice he provided in his column in the Arizona Republic.
