= MPLAB =

Embedded systems development software

MPLAB is a proprietary freeware integrated development environment for the development of embedded applications on PIC and dsPIC microcontrollers, and is developed by Microchip Technology.

MPLAB Extensions for Visual Studio Code and MPLAB X for NetBeans platform are the latest editions of MPLAB, including support for Microsoft Windows, macOS and Linux operating systems.

MPLAB and MPLAB X support project management, code editing, debugging and programming of Microchip 8-bit PIC and AVR (including ATMEGA) microcontrollers, 16-bit PIC24 and dsPIC microcontrollers, as well as 32-bit SAM and PIC32 microcontrollers by Microchip Technology.

== MPLAB X ==
MPLAB X IDE
- Developer: Microchip Technology
- Stable release: 6.30 / January 23, 2026; 3 months ago
- Written in: Java (programming language)
- Operating system: Microsoft Windows >7, Mac OS X, Linux
- License: Proprietary EULA
- Website: MPLAB X Homepage

MPLAB X is the latest version of the MPLAB IDE built by Microchip Technology, and is based on the open-source NetBeans platform. It replaced the older MPLAB 8.x series, which had its final release (version 8.92) on July 23, 2013.

MPLAB X is the first version of the IDE to include cross-platform support for macOS and Linux operating systems, in addition to Microsoft Windows. It supports editing, debugging and programming of Microchip 8-bit, 16-bit and 32-bit PIC microcontrollers. It supports automatic code generation with the MPLAB Code Configurator and the MPLAB Harmony Configurator plugins.

MPLAB X supports the following compilers:

- MPLAB XC8 — C compiler for 8-bit PIC and AVR devices
- MPLAB XC16 — C compiler for 16-bit PIC devices
- MPLAB XC-DSC - C compiler for dsPIC family of devices
- MPLAB XC32 — C/C++ compiler for 32-bit MIPS-based PIC32 and ARM-based SAM devices
- HI-TECH C — C compiler for 8-bit PIC devices (discontinued)
- SDCC — open-source 8-bit C compiler

== MPLAB 8.x ==
MPLAB IDE
- Developer: Microchip Technology
- Final release: 8.92 / July 23, 2013; 12 years ago
- Written in: C++
- Operating system: Microsoft Windows
- License: Proprietary EULA
- Website: www.microchip.com/mplabx

MPLAB 8.x is the discontinued version of the legacy MPLAB IDE technology, custom built by Microchip Technology in Microsoft Visual C++. MPLAB supports project management, editing, debugging and programming of Microchip 8-bit, 16-bit and 32-bit PIC microcontrollers. MPLAB only works on Microsoft Windows. MPLAB is still available from Microchip's archives, but is not recommended for new projects. It is designed to work with MPLAB-certified devices such as the MPLAB ICD 3 and MPLAB REAL ICE, for programming and debugging PIC microcontrollers using a personal computer. PICKit programmers are also supported by MPLAB.

MPLAB supports the following compilers:

- MPLAB MPASM Assembler
- MPLAB ASM30 Assembler
- MPLAB C Compiler for PIC18
- MPLAB C Compiler for PIC24 and dsPIC DSCs
- MPLAB C Compiler for PIC32
- HI-TECH C
