= Parallel slave port =

PIC microcontroller interface

A parallel slave port (PSP) is an interface found on some PIC microcontrollers. It allows 8-bit asynchronous bidirectional data transfer between the PIC and external devices, such as other microcontrollers or personal computers.
