= Microchip Technology =

American integrated circuit company

Microchip Technology Incorporated

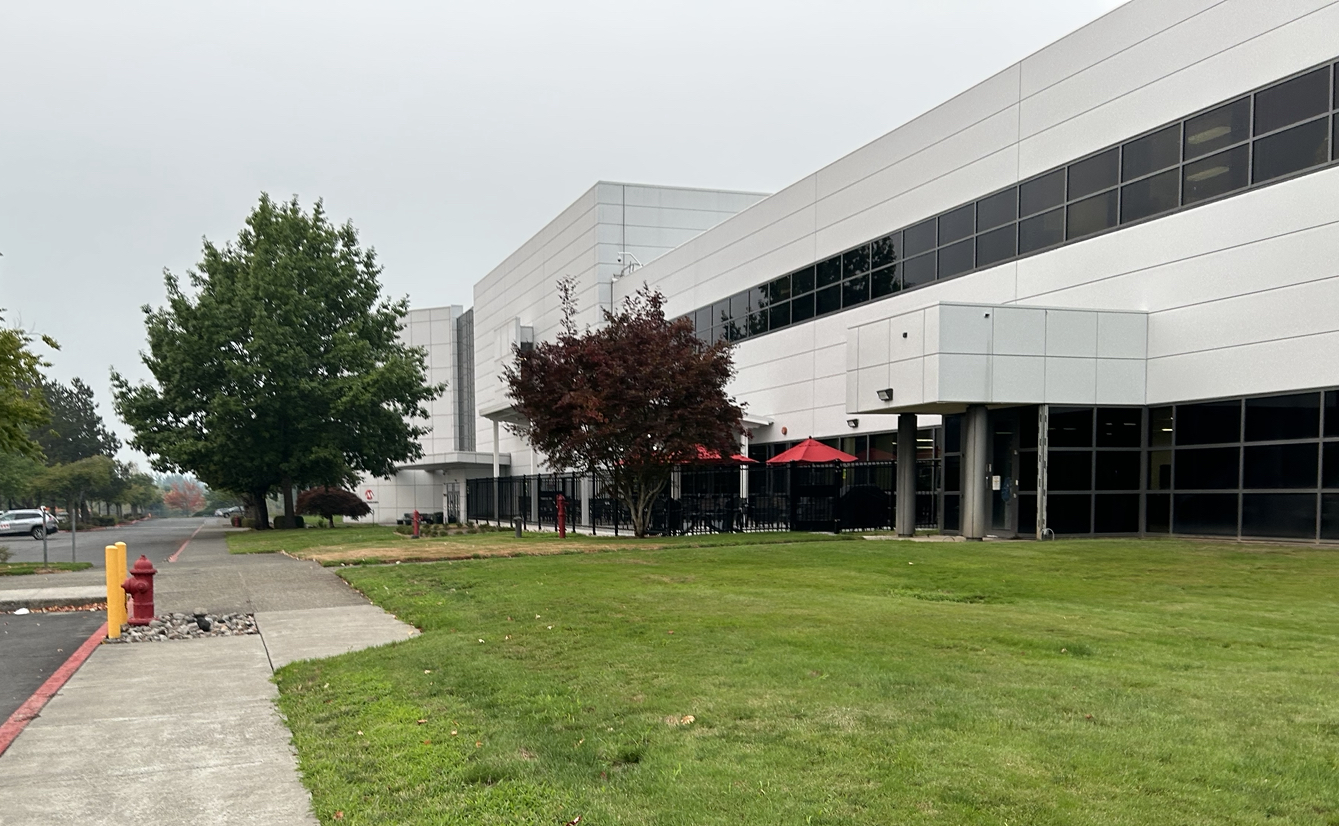
- Fab 4 in Gresham, Oregon, Microchip's largest wafer fab
- Type: Public
- Traded as: Nasdaq: MCHP; Nasdaq-100 component; S&P 500 component
- Industry: Semiconductors
- Founded: February 14, 1989; 37 years ago
- Headquarters: Chandler, Arizona, U.S.
- Key people: Steve Sanghi (president, CEO & chairman); J. Eric Bjornholt (CFO)
- Products: Microcontrollers; Serial EEPROMs; Serial SRAMs; Analog ICs
- Revenue: ▼US$4.40 billion (2025)
- Operating income: ▼US$296 million (2025)
- Net income: ▼US$−2.7 million (2025)
- Total assets: ▼US$15.4 billion (2025)
- Total equity: ▲US$7.08 billion (2025)
- Number of employees: 19,400 (2025)
- Website: microchip.com
- Footnotes; Financials as of March 31, 2025.

Microchip Technology Incorporated is an American publicly traded semiconductor corporation that manufactures microcontrollers, microprocessors, integrated circuits (digital, mixed-signal, and analog), and flash memory.

Its corporate headquarters is located in Chandler, Arizona. Its wafer fabs are located in Gresham, Oregon, and Colorado Springs, Colorado. The company's assembly/test facilities are in Chachoengsao, Thailand, and Calamba and Cabuyao, Philippines.

== History ==
=== Origins ===
Microchip Technology was founded in February 14, 1989 when General Instrument spun off its microelectronics division as a wholly owned subsidiary. The newly formed company was a supplier of programmable non-volatile memory, microcontrollers, digital signal processors, card chip on board, and consumer integrated circuits. An initial public offering (IPO) later in the year was canceled because of the October 1987 stock market crash.

Microchip Technology became an independent company in 1989 when it was acquired by a group of venture capitalists led by Sequoia Capital. In the same year, Microchip Technology announced the release of small, inexpensive 8-bit reduced instruction set computing (RISC) microcontrollers for $2.40 apiece, whereas most RISC microcontrollers were 32-bit devices selling for hundreds of dollars.

=== 1990-2024 ===
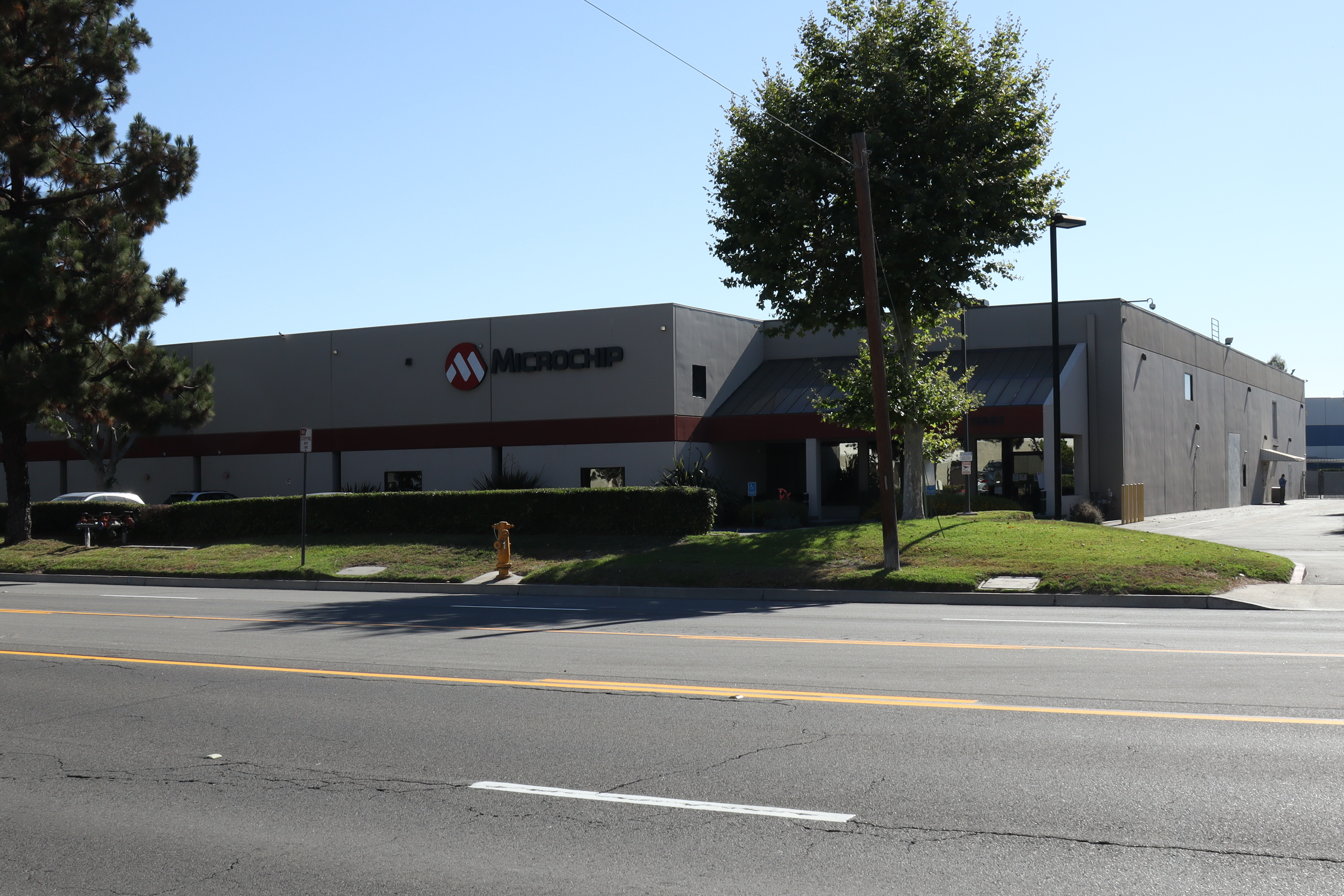
Microchip test facility in Garden Grove, California, formerly owned by Microsemi

In 1990, 60% of Microchip Technology's sales were from the disc drive industry and the product portfolio relied heavily on commodity EEPROM products. The company was losing US$2.5 million per quarter, had less than 6 months of cash in reserve, had exhausted lines of credit, and was failing to control expenses. Early in the year, the venture capital investors accepted an offer to sell Microchip Technology to Winbond Electronics Corporation of Taiwan for $15 million. Winbond Electronics backed out of the deal after the Taiwanese stock market decreased in May 1990. Vice President of Operations, Steve Sanghi, was named president and chief operating officer of Microchip Technology in 1990. After several quarters of losses, Sanghi oversaw Microchip Technology's transition from selling commodity-based products to specialized chips, such as the RISC technology.

Microchip Technology conducted an IPO in 1993, which Fortune magazine cited as the best-performing IPO of the year with a stock appreciation of 500% and over $1 billion in market capitalization. At the end of 2015, Microchip Technology posted its 100th consecutive quarter of profitability.

In March 2021, Sanghi was replaced as CEO by Ganesh Moorthy.

=== 2024-present ===
In March 2024, Microchip furloughed production staff and non-manufacturing employees were forced to take a pay-cut for two weeks. This was done again in June. In late November, Moorthy retired as CEO and Steve Sanghi was appointed interim CEO, and was subsequently announced he would continue as CEO and Chairman on a permanent basis on July 2, 2025.

In early December 2024, Sanghi announced the closure of Fab 2 in Tempe, Arizona and also announced that Microchip would suspend its application for CHIPS and Science Act funding. On February 10, 2025, Microchip announced that it would again furlough employees intermittently throughout the rest of the year.

=== Acquisitions ===
- In 1995, Microchip acquired KeeLoq technology from Nanoteq of South Africa for $10M in cash. Microchip Technology used the purchase to create the Secure Data Products Group.
- On May 24, 2000, Microchip acquired a wafer fab in Puyallup, Washington that was formerly owned by Matsushita Electric Industrial Company. On October 19, 2007, due to the great recession, the facility, known as Fab 3, was sold for $30M from an unsolicited offer.
- On October 27, 2000, Microchip purchased TelCom Semiconductor of Mountain View, California for $300M.
- In 2002, Microchip acquired a wafer fab in Gresham, Oregon from Fujitsu for $183.5M. This fab became, and still is, Microchip's largest and is known as Fab 4.
- On October 15, 2008, Microchip acquired Hampshire Company, a company that sold large-format universal touch screen controller electronics and related software.
- On February 20, 2009, Microchip acquired Australia-based HI-TECH Software.
- On January 11, 2010, Microchip acquired Thomas H. Lee's Sunnyvale, California-based ZeroG Wireless for an undisclosed amount after a year-long partnership. The deal allowed Microchip to provide a Wi-Fi product for its PIC microcontrollers.
- In April 2010, Microchip completed the acquisition of Silicon Storage Technology (SST) from for about $292M. Microchip and Cerberus Capital Management both made offers for the company. Microchip sold several SST flash memory assets back to Bing Yeh, co-founder of SST, to another one his companies the next month.
- In 2012, Microchip acquired German-based Ident Technology AG, California based Roving Networks, and Standard Microsystems Corporation.
- On June 3, 2013, Microchip acquired Novocell Semiconductor, Inc. through its Silicon Storage Technology (SST) subsidiary.
- In 2014, Microchip acquired Supertex, Inc and Belgian-based EqcoLogic on February 10, and Taiwan-based ISSC Technologies on May 22.
- On August 3, 2015, Microchip acquired IC manufacturer Micrel for about $839M.
- In January 2016, Microchip purchased San Jose, California-based Atmel for $3.56bn. JPMorgan Chase advised Microchip while Qatalyst Partners advised Atmel.
- In May 2018, Microchip acquired Microsemi Corporation.
- In October 2020, Microchip acquired New Zealand-based Tekron International Limited for an undisclosed amount.
- In April 2024, Microchip acquired both South Korea-based VSI Co. Ltd. and Neuronix AI Labs.
- In September 2026, Microchip acquired Israeli AI company Hailo.
- In October 2026, Microchip acquired VORAGO Technologies.

== Products ==
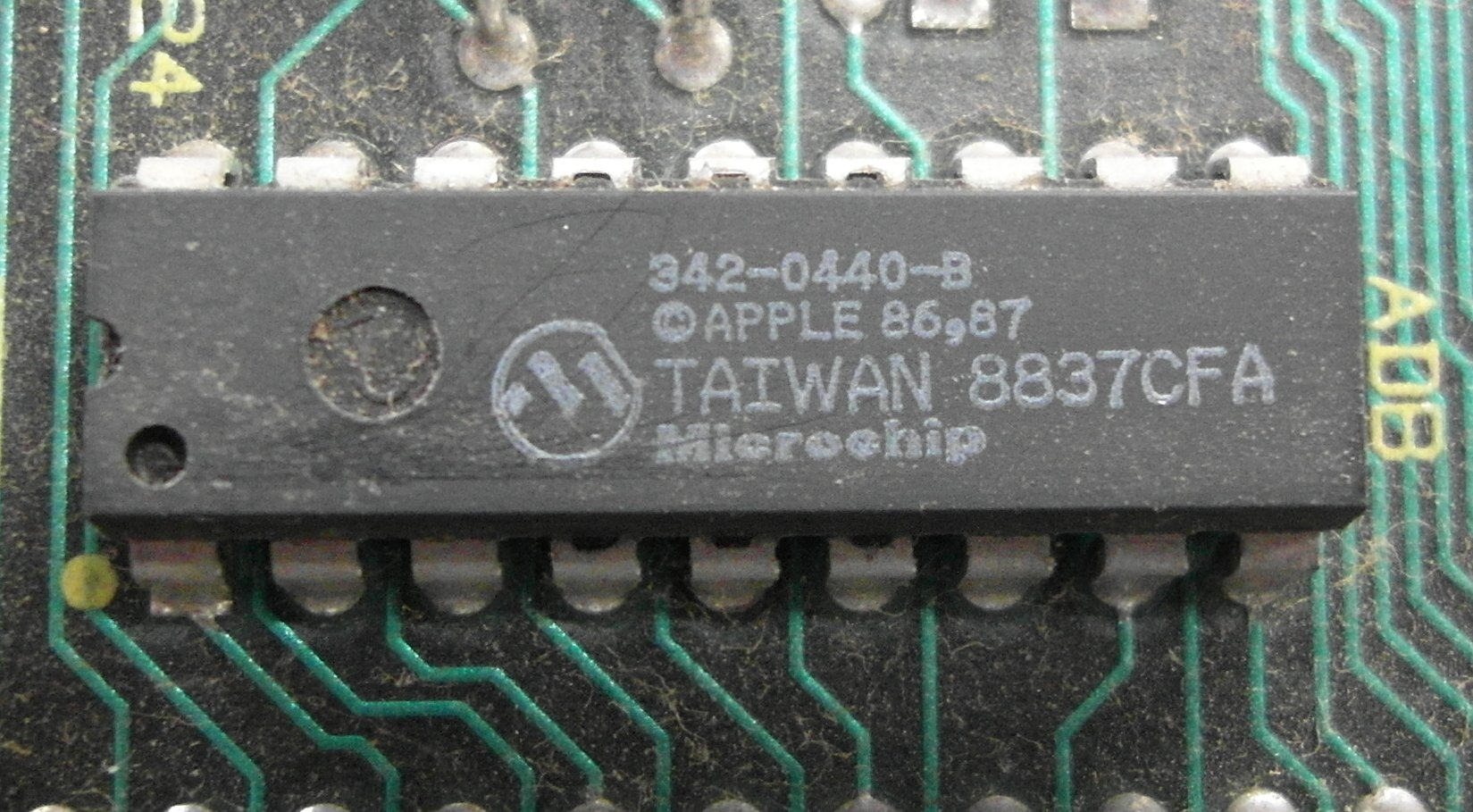
A 1988 vintage Microchip PIC16CR54 with the Apple Desktop Bus protocol pre-programmed, before it became an independent company, as used in a Macintosh SE

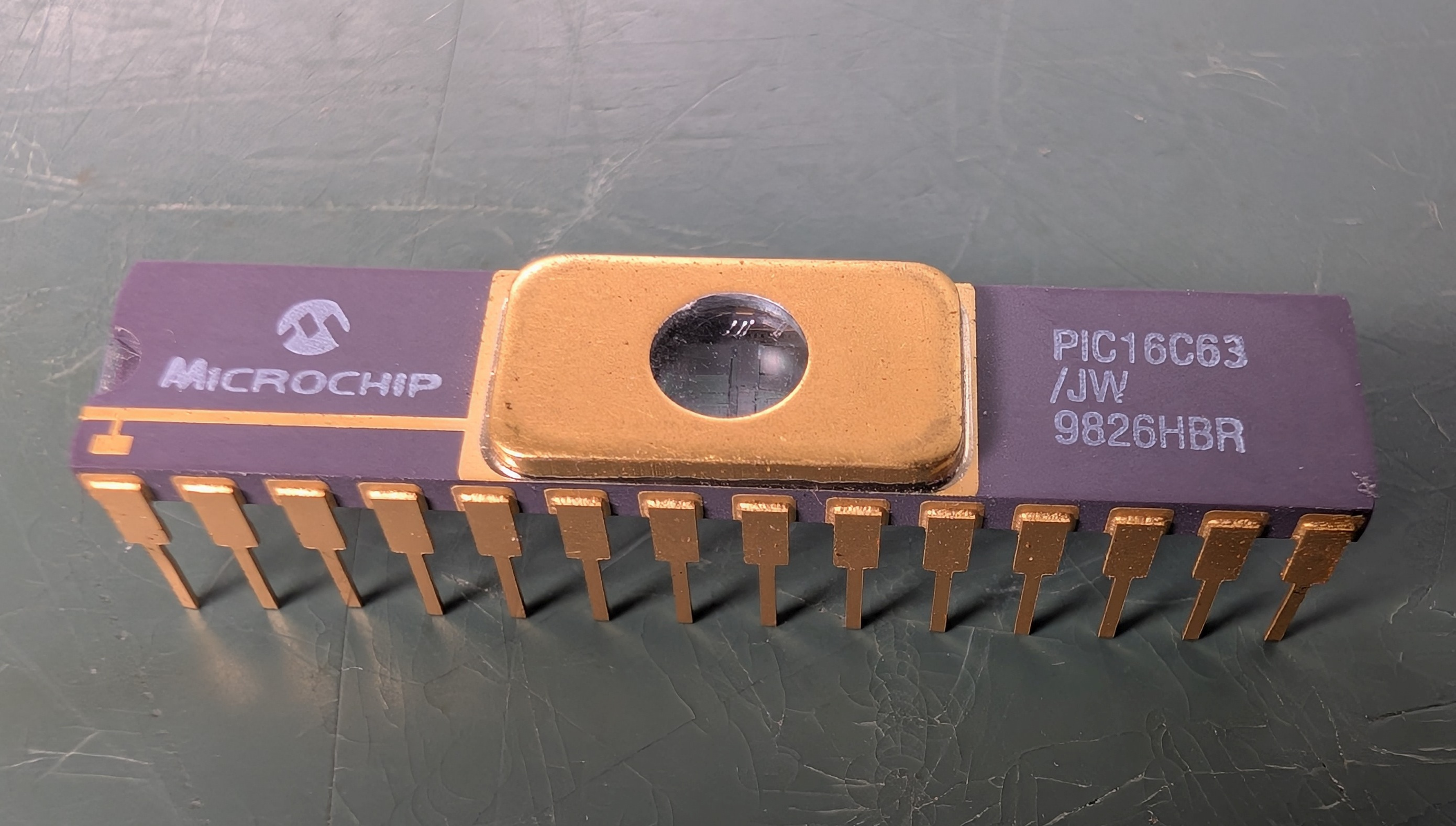
Microchip Technology PIC16C63 EPROM Erasable Ceramic DIP Package PIC Microcontroller

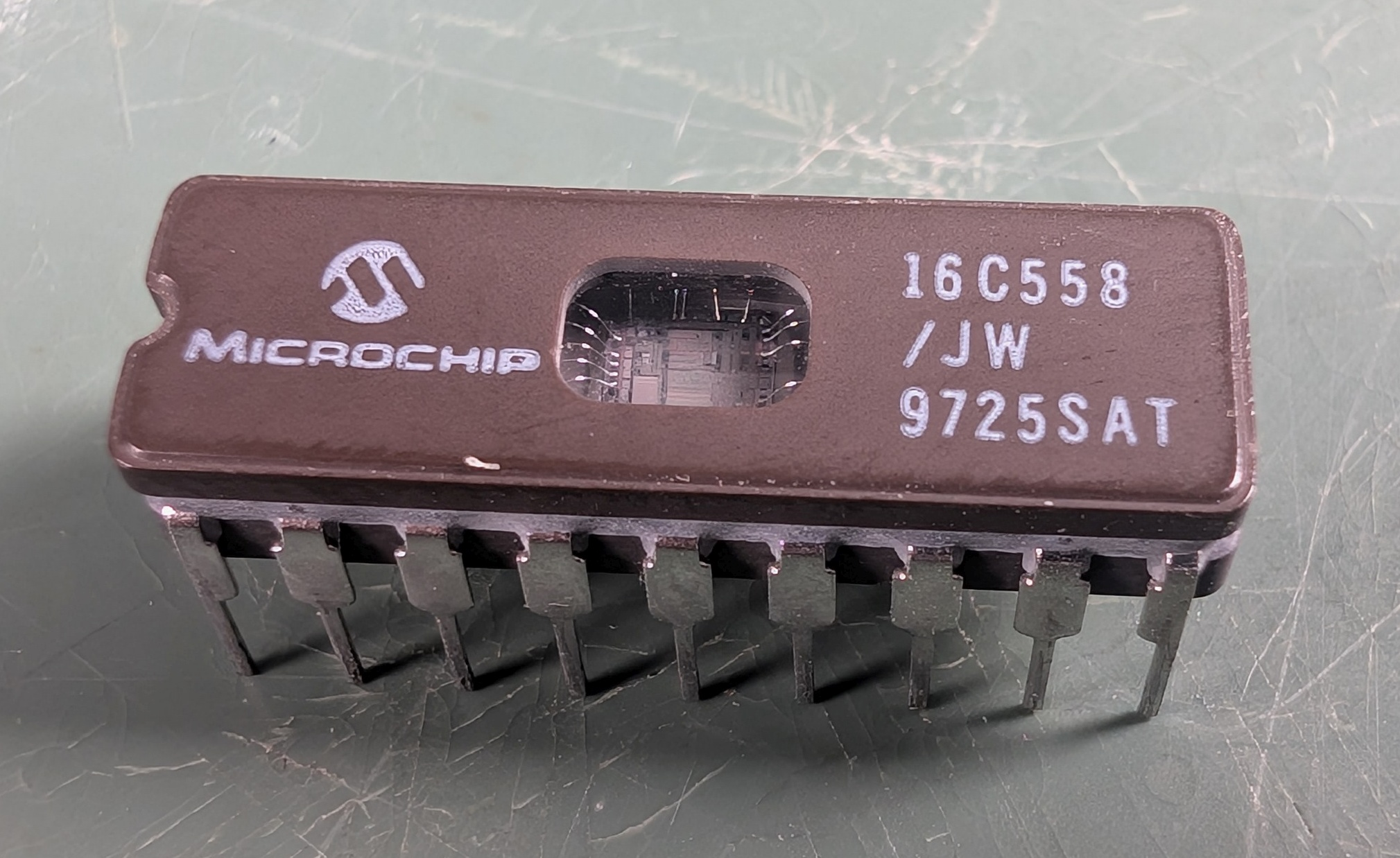
Microchip Technology PIC16C558 EPROM DIP Microcontroller. EPROM and EEPROM versions were used before FLASH based PIC16F parts became available.

Microchip offers 8, 16, and 32-bit microcontrollers including PIC and AVR microcontrollers, microprocessors, analog power management and conversion, CAN and LIN serial communication interface devices, high-voltage MEMS and piezoelectric drivers, ultrasound multiplexers, digital signal controllers, embedded controllers, memory products (including serial EEPROM, serial SRAM, serial flash, serial NvSRAM, serial EERAM, parallel EEPROM, parallel one-time programmable flash, parallel flash and CryptoMemory devices).

Microchip also offers custom programming, hardware and software development tools, and reference designs. Available reference designs include complete systems, subsystems or functions which are purpose-built and include design files, software and support.

Microchip crypto element devices that provide authentication, data integrity, and confidentiality in a variety of applications, such as disposables, accessories and nodes; Timing, communication and real-time clock and calendar products; USB products; Power Management Integrated Circuits (PMICs); and networking products including Ethernet interface and wireless products.

=== Product milestones ===
In April 2009, Microchip Technology announced the nanoWatt XLP microcontrollers, claiming the world's lowest sleep current. Microchip Technology had sold more than 6 billion microcontrollers as of 2009. As of 2011, Microchip Technology ships over a billion processors every year. In September 2011, Microchip Technology shipped the 10 billionth PIC microcontroller.

Examples of Microchip Products

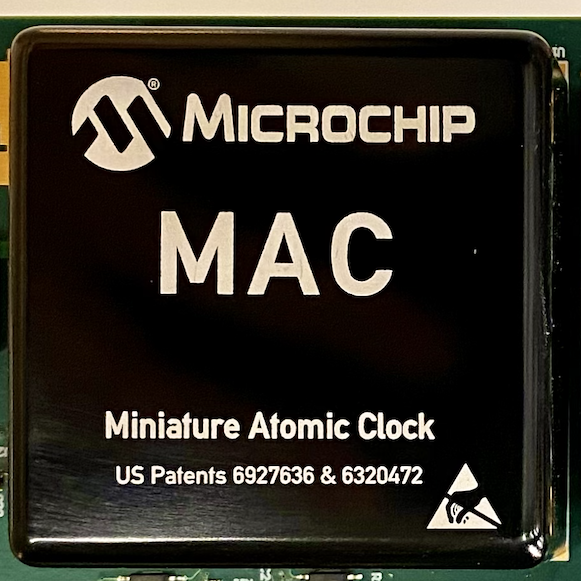
Microchip MAC rubidium atomic clock module

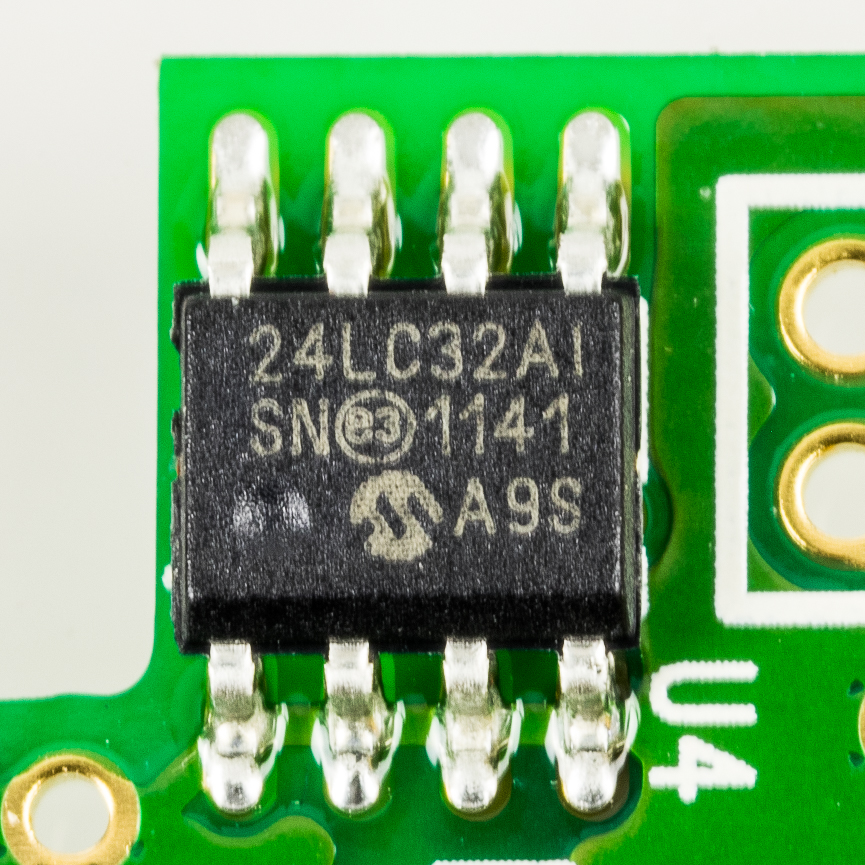
Microchip 24LA32AI - 32K I²C Serial EEPROM

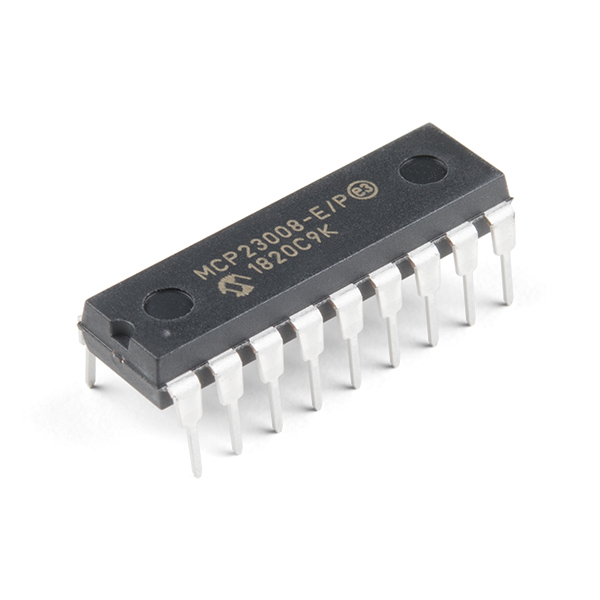
Microchip MCP23008 I²C 8-Bit I/O Expander

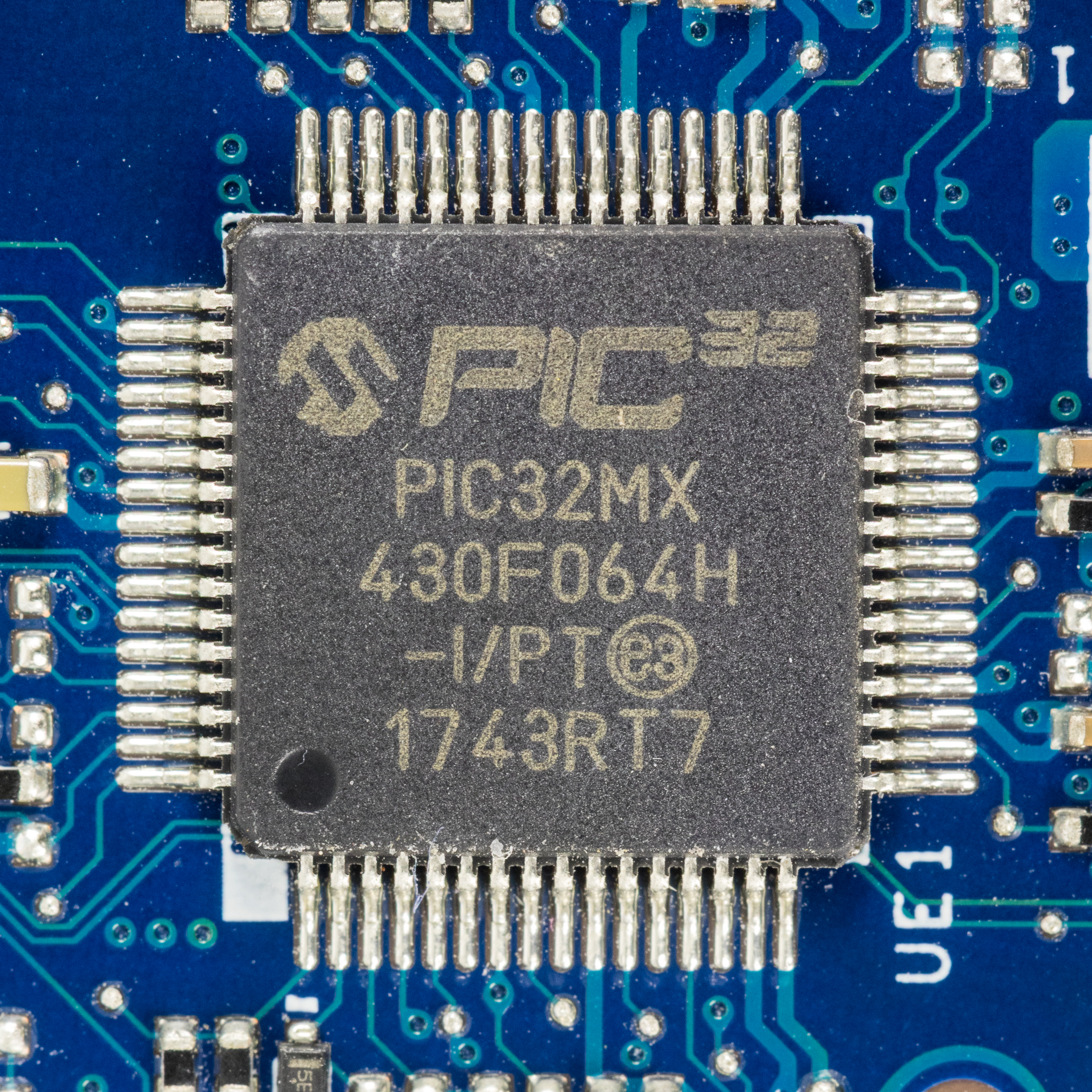
Microchip PIC32MX430F064H PIC32 microcontroller

== Wafer fabs ==
Plant Name	Location	Status
Fab 1	Chandler, Arizona, United States	Defunct. Closed April 2003.
Fab 2	Tempe, Arizona, United States	Defunct. Closed November 2024.
Fab 3	Puyallup, Washington, United States	Defunct. Sold October 2007
Fab 4	Gresham, Oregon, United States	Open
Fab 5	Colorado Springs, Colorado, United States	Open

== See also ==
- ATtiny microcontroller comparison chart
- AVR microcontrollers
- KeeLoq
- MiWi
- MPLAB devices
- MPLAB
- PIC microcontrollers
- PIC16x84
- PICkit
- UNI/O
