= Hex file =

Hex file, hex file format or hex record may refer to:

- Intel hex format, a hex file format by Intel since 1973
- Digital Research hex format, a hex file format by Digital Research
- elektor assembler hex format (EASM), a hex file format by elektor
- Microchip Technology hex format, a hex file format by Microchip
- MOS Technology file format, a hex file format by MOS Technology
- Motorola hex format, a hex file format by Motorola
- Tektronix hex format, hex file format by Tektronix
- Texas Instruments hex format, a hex file format by Texas Instruments
- Texas Instruments TI-TXT (TI Text)
- Universal hex format, a hex file format by the BBC/Micro:bit
- Zilog hex format, a hex file format by Zilog

== See also ==
- Hex dump
- Hexadecimal notation
- Alphanumeric executable
- Executable ASCII code
- IBM hexadecimal floating-point
- P notation
