= Programmer (hardware) =

Device that installs firmware on a device

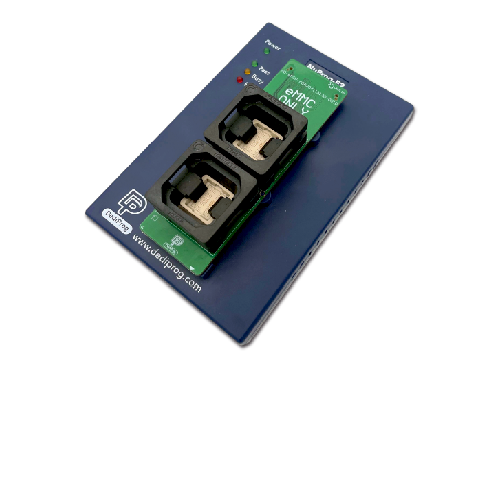
Engineering Universal Programmer with two sockets

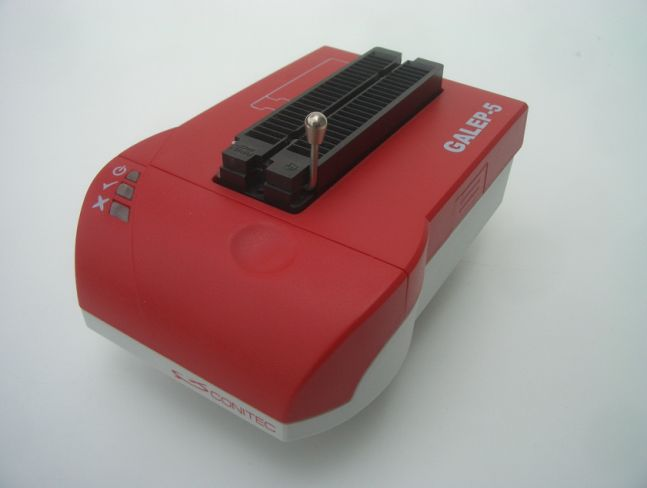
Pocket Programmer Galep-5 with a ZIF socket

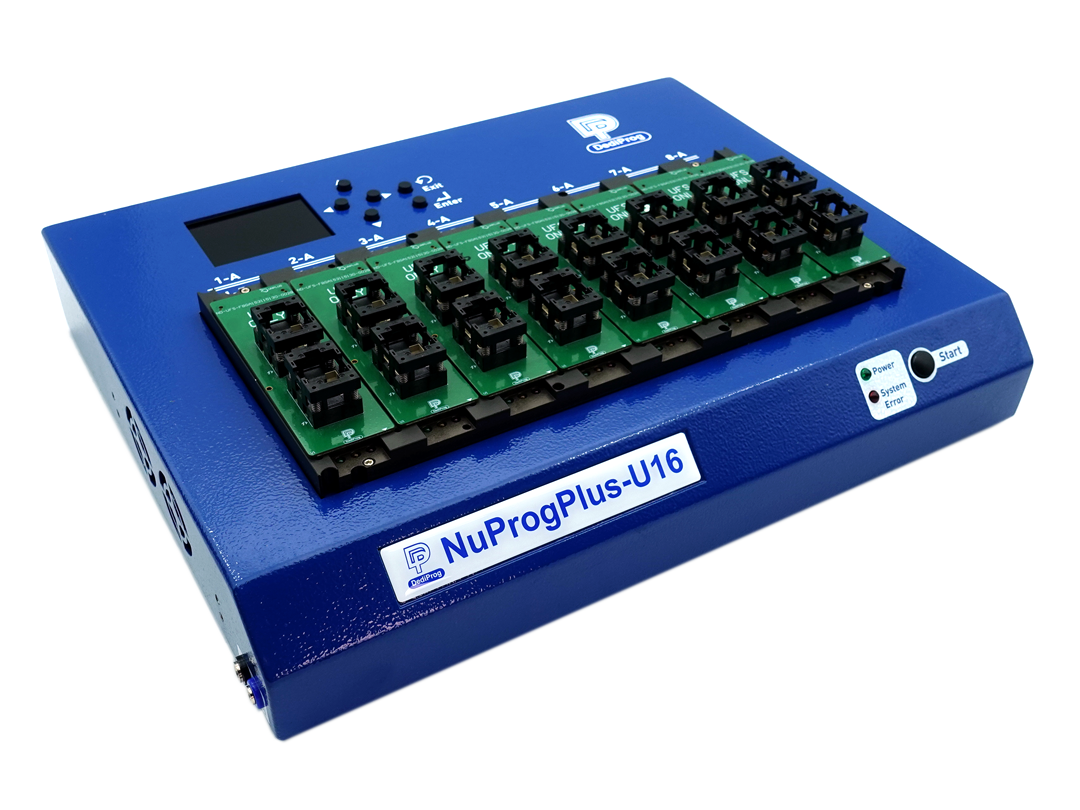
Universal Gang Programmer with 16 sockets

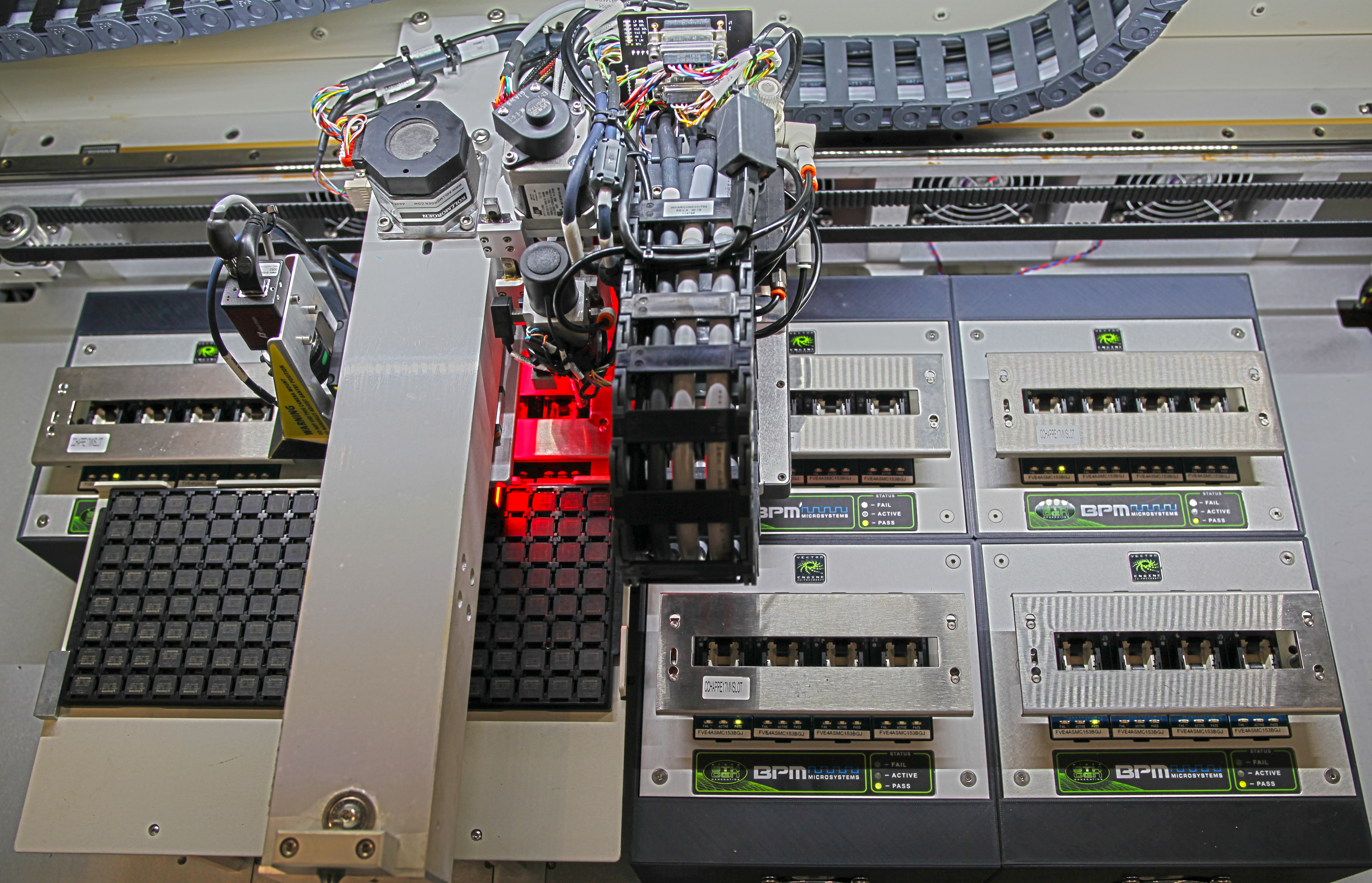
The 3928, with up to seven sites, is made for programming large data devices, such as MCUs, eMMC HS400, NAND, NOR and Serial Flash devices. High-speed signals support devices up to 200 MHz and the latest eMMC HS400 modes with data transfer rates of 2.5 nanoseconds per byte.

In the context of installing firmware onto a device, a programmer, device programmer, chip programmer, device burner, or PROM writer is a device that writes, a.k.a. burns, firmware to a target device's non-volatile memory.

Typically, the target programmable chip is one of the following types: PROM, EPROM, EEPROM, Flash memory, eMMC, MRAM, FeRAM, NVRAM, PLD, PLA, PAL, GAL, CPLD, FPGA, microcontroller.

== Connection ==
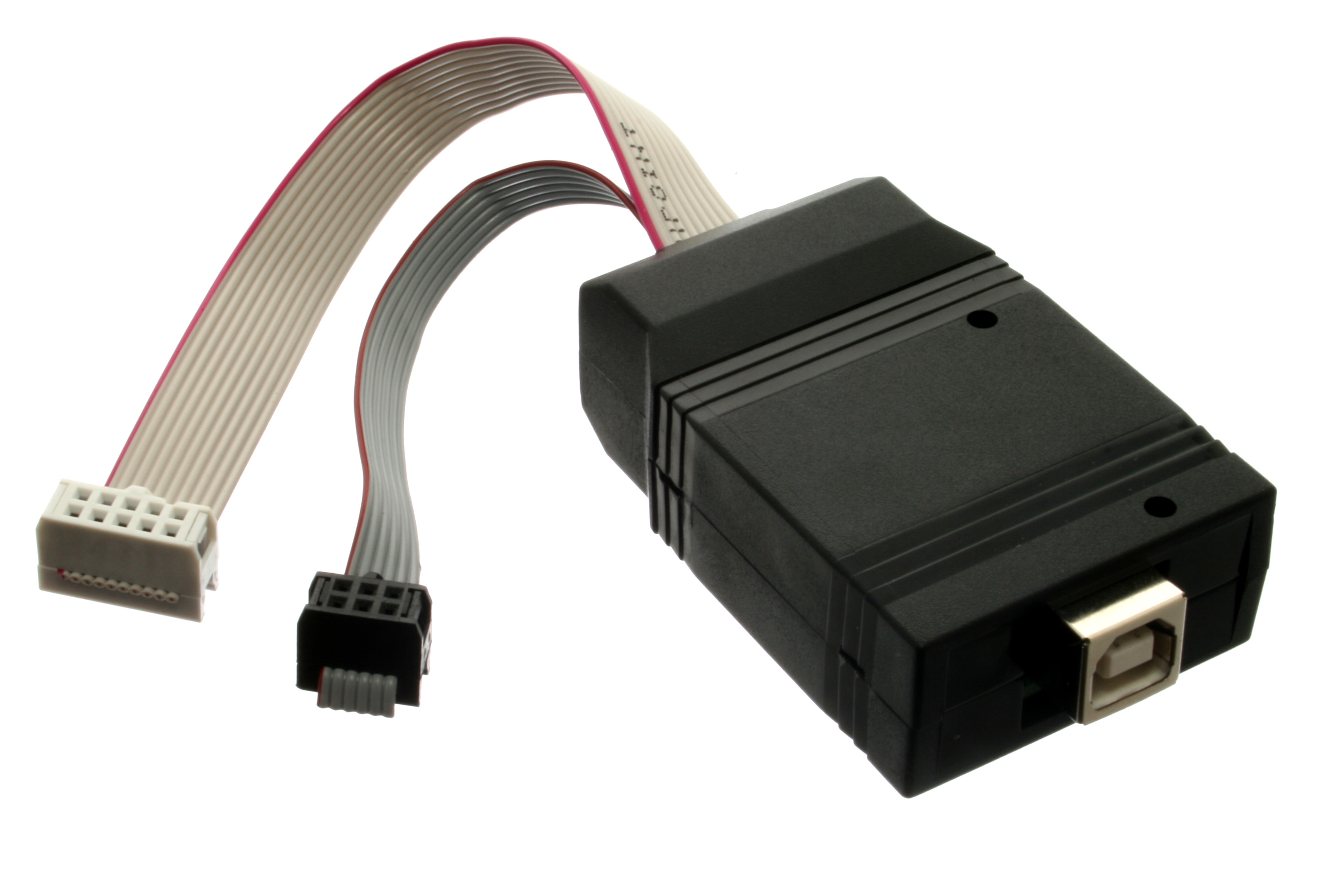
JTAG Connector-based On-Board Programmer for AVR microcontroller with USB Port interface

Generally, a programmer connects to a device in one of two ways.

=== Insertion ===
In some cases, the target device is inserted into a socket (usually ZIF) on the programmer. If the device is not a standard DIP packaging, a plug-in adapter board, which converts the footprint with another socket, is used.

=== Cable & port ===
In some cases, a programmer connects to a device via a cable to a connection port on the device. This is sometimes called on-board programming, in-circuit programming, or in-system programming.

== Transfer ==
Data is transferred from the programmer to the device as signals via connecting pins.

Some devices have a serial interface for receiving data (including JTAG interface). Other devices communicate on parallel pins, followed by a programming pulse with a higher voltage for programming the data into the device.

Usually, a programmer is controlled via a connected personal computer through a parallel port, USB port, or LAN interface. A program on the controlling computer interacts with the programmer to perform operations such as configure install parameters and program the device,

== Types ==
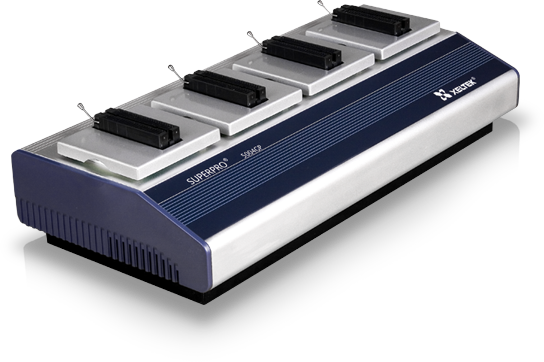
A Gang Programmer with a Set of 4 Sockets.

There are four general types of programmers:

1. Automated programmers often have multiple programming sites/sockets for mass production. Sometimes used with robotic pick and place handlers with on-board sites to support high volume and complex output such as laser marking, 3D inspection, tape input/output, etc.
2. Development programmers usually have a single programming site; used for first article development and small-series production.
3. Pocket programmers for development and field service.
4. Specialized programmers for certain circuit types only, such as FPGA, microcontroller, and EEPROM programmers.

== History ==
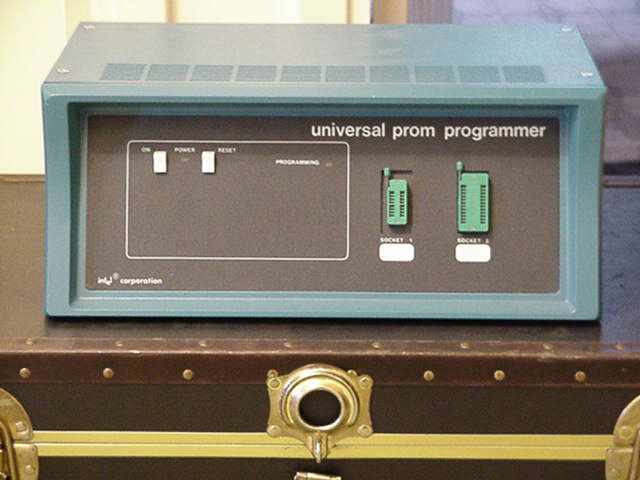
Historical Programmer; A shoebox size

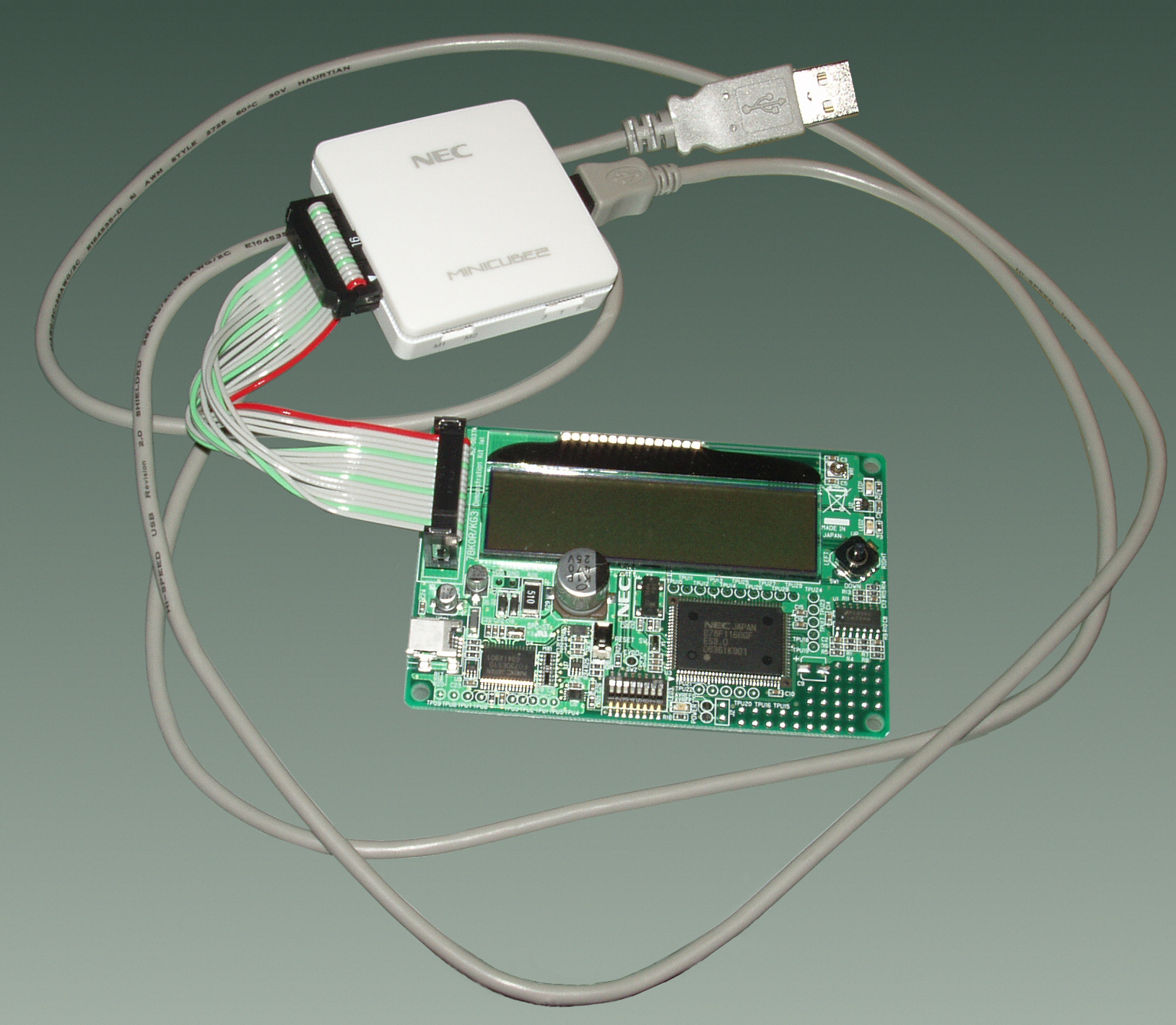
Pocket-sized & USB Port interfaced "ICE for MCU" & Flash memory Programmer

Regarding old PROM programmers, as the many programmable devices have different voltage requirements, every pin driver must be able to apply different voltages in a range of 0–25 Volts. But according to the progress of memory device technology, recent flash memory programmers do not need high voltages.

In the early days of computing, booting mechanism was a mechanical device usually consisting of switches and LEDs. It means the programmer was not an equipment but a human, who entered machine codes one by one, by setting the switches in a series of "on" and "off" positions. These positions of switches corresponded to the machine codes, similar to today's assembly language. Nowadays, EEPROMs are used for bootstrapping mechanism as BIOS, without the need to operate mechanical switches for programming.

== Manufacturers ==
For each vendor's web site, refer to "External links" section.

- Batronix GmbH & Co. KG
- BPM Microsystems
- Conitec Datasystems
- Data I/O Corporation
- DediProg Technology Co., Ltd
- Elnec s.r.o
- Elprosys Sp. z o.o.
- halec
- Hi-Lo System Research
- MCUmall Electronics Inc.
- Minato Holdings
- Phyton, Inc.
- Xeltek Inc.

== See also ==
- Off-line programming
- In-system programming
- Debug port
- JTAG interface
- Common Flash Memory Interface
- Open NAND Flash Interface Working Group
- Atmel AVR#Programming interfaces
- PIC microcontroller#Device programmers
- Intel HEX – ASCII file format
- SREC – ASCII file format
- ELF – Binary file format
- COFF – Binary file format
- Hardware description language
