= IHX =

IHX or ihx may refer to:

- Internal heat exchanger, a type of heat exchanger
- .ihx, the filename extension for Intel HEX
