= Dov Frohman =

Israeli electrical engineer and business executive

- דב פרוהמן
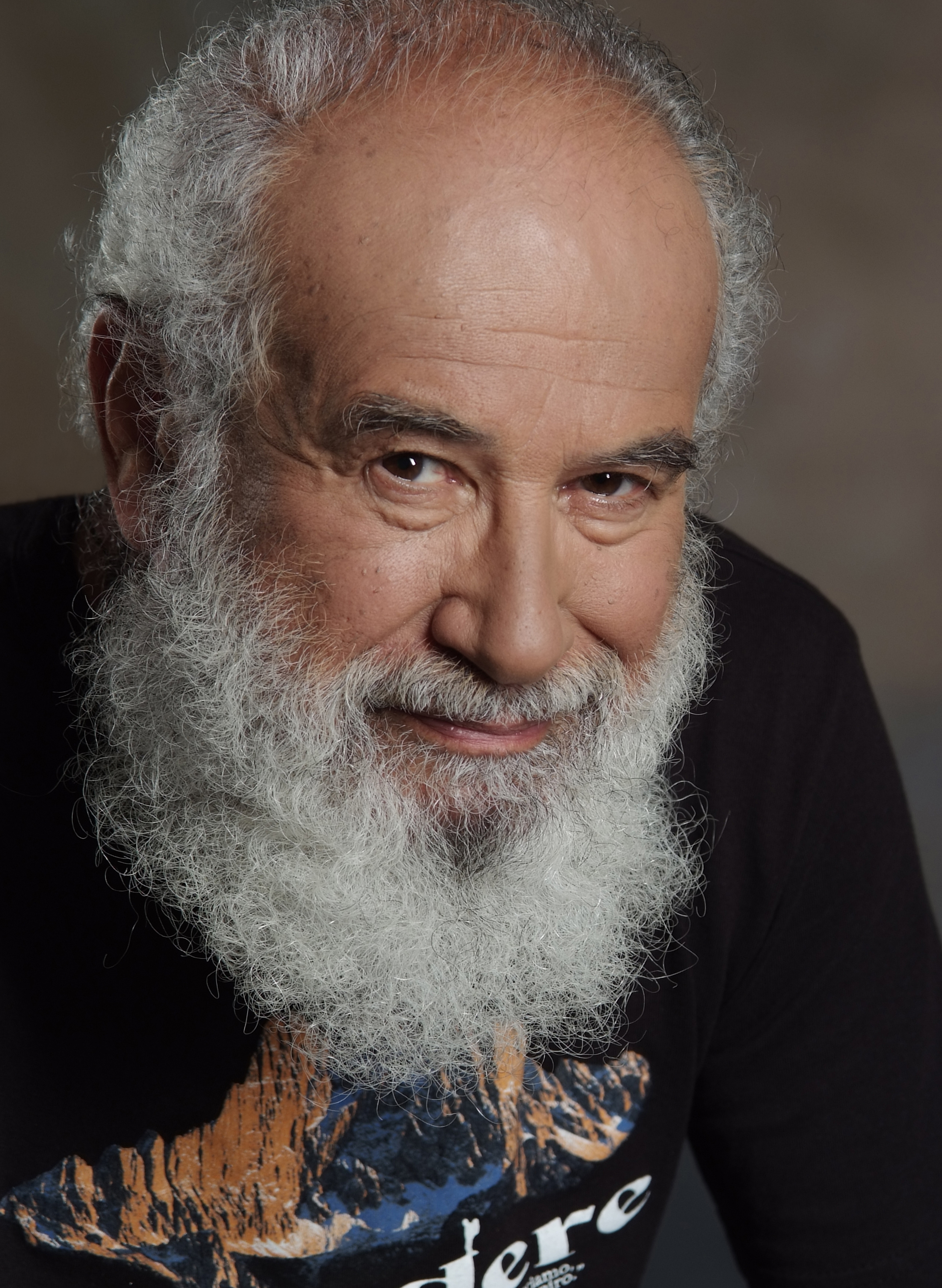
- Born: March 28, 1939 (age 87); Amsterdam
- Education: University of California, Berkeley, Technion - Israel Institute of Technology
- Known for: EPROM
- Awards: IEEE Edison Medal (2008); Israel Prize
- Scientific career
- Fields: Electrical engineering

Dov Frohman (Hebrew: דב פרוהמן, also Dov Frohman-Bentchkowsky; born March 28, 1939) is an Israeli electrical engineer and business executive. A former vice president of Intel Corporation, he is the inventor of the erasable programmable read only memory (EPROM) and the founder and first general manager of Intel Israel. He is also the author (with Robert Howard) of Leadership the Hard Way (Jossey-Bass, 2008).

== Biography ==
Dov Frohman was born in March 1939 in Amsterdam, five months before the start of World War II. His parents were Abraham and Feijga Frohman, Polish Jews who had emigrated to the Netherlands in the early 1930s to escape rising anti-Semitism in Poland. In 1942, after the German invasion of the Low Countries and as the Nazi grip on Holland's Jewish community tightened, his parents decided to give their child to acquaintances in the Dutch resistance who placed him with the Van Tilborghs, an orthodox Christian farming family that lived in the village of Sprang-Capelle in the region of North Brabant near the Belgian border. The Van Tilborghs hid Frohman for the duration of the war. His parents were murdered in the Holocaust.

Located by relatives in Israel after the war, Frohman spent a few years in orphanages for Jewish children whose parents had died in the war, before emigrating to Israel in 1949, after the founding of the Jewish state. Adopted by relatives, he grew up in Tel Aviv and served in the Israeli army. In 1959, he enrolled for the Technion - Israel Institute of Technology to study electrical engineering. After graduating from the Technion in 1963, Frohman traveled to the United States to study for his master's and Ph.D. at the University of California, Berkeley. After receiving his master's degree in 1965, he took a job in the R&D labs of Fairchild Semiconductor.

== EPROM development ==
In 1969, after completing his Ph.D., he followed former Fairchild managers Gordon Moore, Robert Noyce, and Andrew Grove to Intel Corporation, which they had founded the previous year.

It was while troubleshooting a fault in an early Intel product that Frohman in 1970 developed the concept for the EPROM, the first non-volatile semiconductor memory that was both erasable and easily reprogrammable. At the time, there were two types of semiconductor memories. Random-access memory (RAM) chips were easy to program, but a chip would lose its charge (and the information encoded on the chip) when its power source was turned off. In industry parlance, RAM chips were volatile. Read-only memory (ROM) chips, by contrast, were nonvolatile—that is, the information encoded in the chip was fixed and unchangeable. But the process for programming ROM memories was time-consuming and cumbersome. Typically, the data had to be “burned in” at the factory: physically embedded on the chip through a process called “masking” that generally took weeks to complete. And once programmed, the data in the ROM chip could not be altered.

The EPROM was nonvolatile and reprogrammable. It was the catalyst for innovations and developments that led to flash memory technology. The EPROM was also a key innovation in the personal computer industry. Intel founder Gordon Moore called it “as important in the development of the microcomputer industry as the microprocessor itself.” It remained Intel's most profitable product well into the 1980s.

== Intel Israel ==
After inventing the EPROM, Frohman left Intel to teach electrical engineering at the University of Science and Technology in Kumasi, Ghana. He returned to Intel in 1973, but his long-term vision was to return to Israel to create a center of high-tech research there. In 1974, he helped Intel establish a small chip design center in Haifa—Intel's first outside the United States. On his return to Israel, Frohman taught at the School of Applied Sciences at Hebrew University of Jerusalem and worked as a consultant to Intel on the side. In 1985, after negotiations with the Israeli government on the establishment of a semiconductor plant in Jerusalem, Intel's first outside the United States, he left Hebrew University to become general manager of Intel Israel.

In 1991, during the First Gulf War, when Iraq attacked Israel with Scud missiles, Frohman kept Intel Israel open despite recommendations from the Israel Civil Defense authority that all non-essential businesses close down. As a result, Intel Israel was one of the few businesses, and the only manufacturing business, in the country to remain open throughout the war. Frohman described his experience during the war in an article in the Harvard Business Review. In 1995, he led Intel's efforts to establish a second semiconductor fab in Israel, in the town of Kiryat Gat in the south of Israel on the edge of the Negev Desert.

Today, Intel Israel is the headquarters for the corporation's global R&D for wireless technology. It developed the company's Centrino mobile computing technology, which powers laptops, and advanced microprocessor products. It is also a major center for chip manufacture. In 2008, the company opened a second semiconductor fab in Kiryat Gat - a $3.5 billion investment, with seven thousand employees. In 2007, Intel Israel's exports totaled $1.4 billion and represented roughly 8.5 percent of the total exports of Israel's electronics and information industry.

Frohman retired from Intel in 2001.

== Awards and recognition ==
- In 1982, Frohman was the recipient of the IEEE Jack Morton Award for meritorious achievement in the field of solid state devices.
- In 1991, he was awarded the Israel Prize for exact sciences in Engineering.
- In 2008, he received the IEEE's Edison Medal, honoring a career of meritorious achievement in electrical engineering.
- In 2009, he was inducted into the National Inventors Hall of Fame.
- In 2018, he was made Fellow of the Computer History Museum.

He is also a member of the Israel Academy of Sciences and Humanities.

== See also ==
- List of Israel Prize recipients
