= EFuse =

Technology to reprogram computer chips

In computing, an eFuse (electronic fuse) is a microscopic fuse put into a computer chip. This technology was invented by IBM in 2004 to allow for the dynamic real-time reprogramming of chips. In the abstract, computer logic is generally "etched" or "hard-wired" onto a chip and cannot be changed after the chip has finished being manufactured. By utilizing a set of eFuses, a chip manufacturer can allow for the circuits on a chip to change while it is in operation.

== Mechanism of action ==
eFuses can be made out of silicon or metal traces. In both cases, they work (blow) by electromigration, the phenomenon where electric flow causes the conductor material to move. Although electromigration is generally undesired in chip design as it causes failures, eFuses are made of weak traces that are designed to fail before others do.

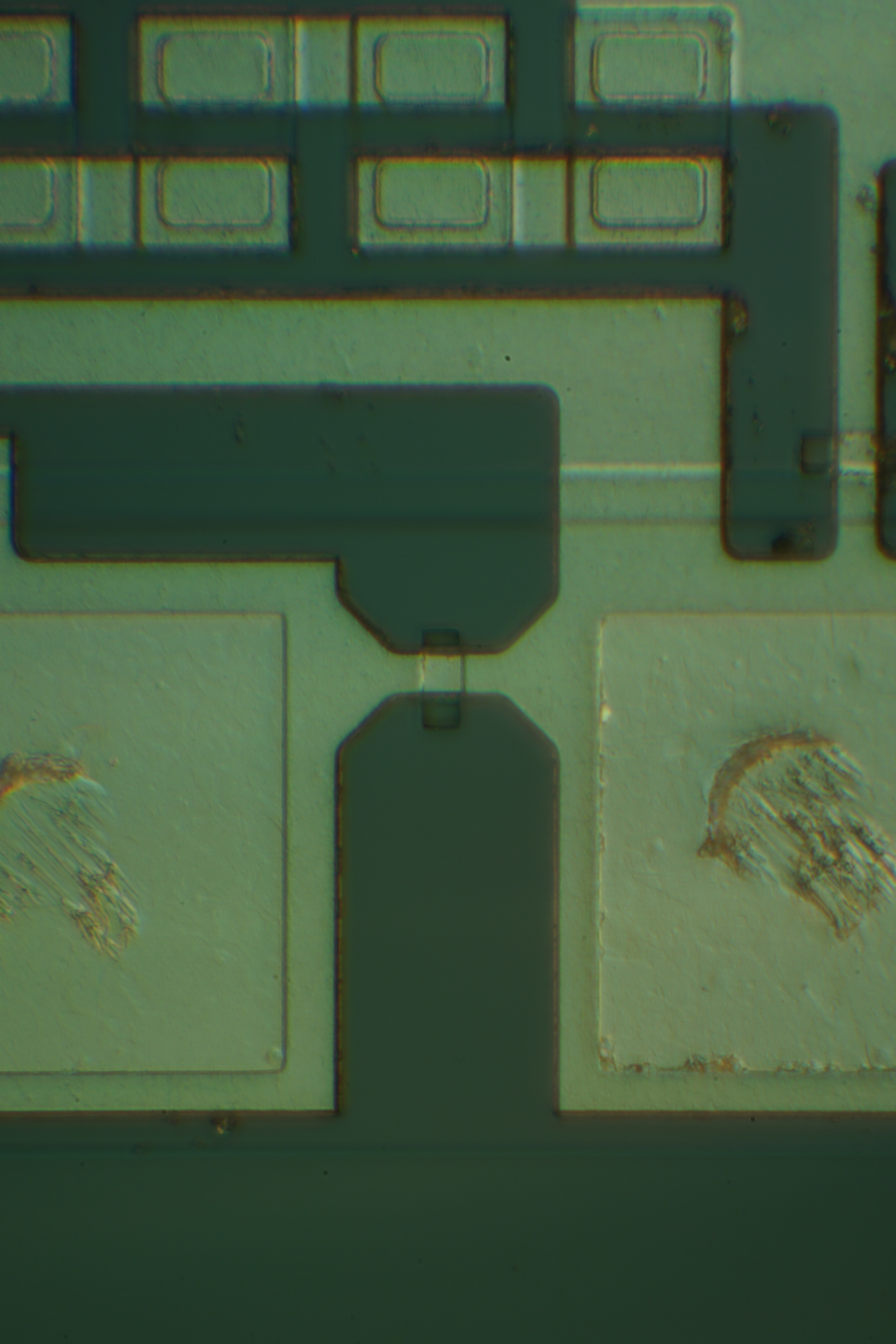
Intact fuse

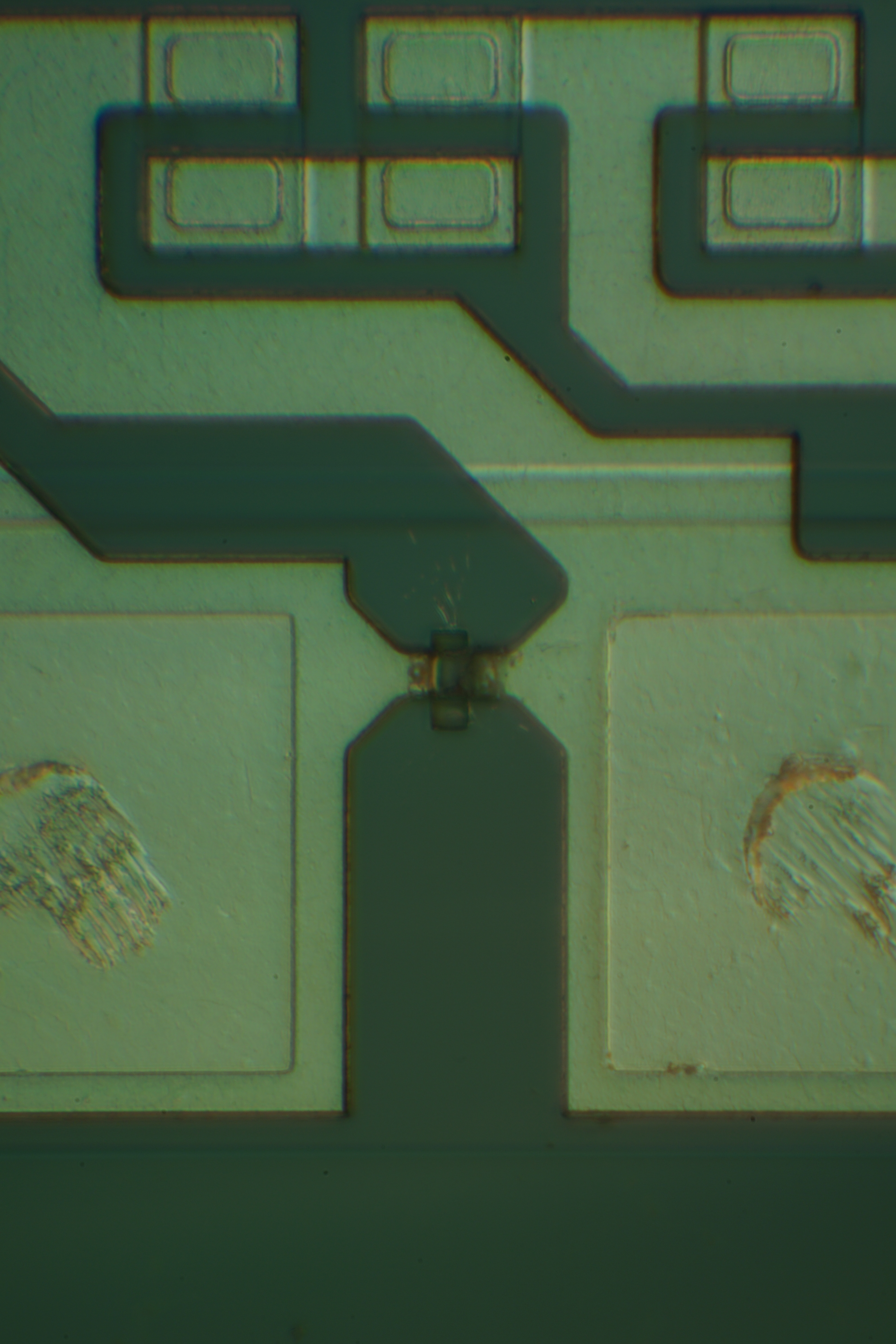
Blown fuse

== Uses ==
eFuses were initially marketed by IBM as a way to provide in-chip performance tuning. If certain sub-systems fail, or are taking too long to respond, or are consuming too much power, the chip can instantly change its behavior by blowing an eFUSE. Today, most eFuses are used to etch serialization or calibration data onto a chip thus making it a read-only value.

== Descriptive term ==
eFuses are perhaps more commonly used as a one-time programmable ROM or write-restricted memory, and not actual physical electric fuses. This ranges from writing unique information onto CPUs, or in the case of game consoles and other restricted hardware, preventing downgrades by permanently recording a newer version. The Xbox 360, Nintendo Switch, Pixel 6 and Samsung Galaxy S22 are known for using eFuses this way.

== Implementations ==
eFuses used for performance adjustment or unique IDs:

- IBM POWER5 and POWER6 high-end RISC processors; probably all newer models
- IBM System z9 and System z10 mainframe processors
- Sony/Toshiba/IBM Cell used in PlayStation 3. Not claimed to be used for downgrade prevention.
- Intel Westmere CPUs; probably all newer models
- TI MSP430 MCU family for Unique IDs.
- TI FPD-Link SERDES for a variety of different settings.

eFuses known to be used for hardware restriction:

- IBM/Microsoft Xenon CPU in the Xbox 360 game console. 768 bits of fuses.
- Samsung Knox devices use an eFuse to detect if a non-Samsung boot path has ever been run.

== Variants ==
Resettable eFuses are used for protecting circuits. They act similarly to resettable fuses, and are generally shipped as a standalone chip package.

There are several ways of implementing an antifuse in silicon: see Antifuse § Antifuses in integrated circuits.

== See also ==
- Antifuse
- Reconfigurable computing
