= EPROM =

Early type of solid state computer memory

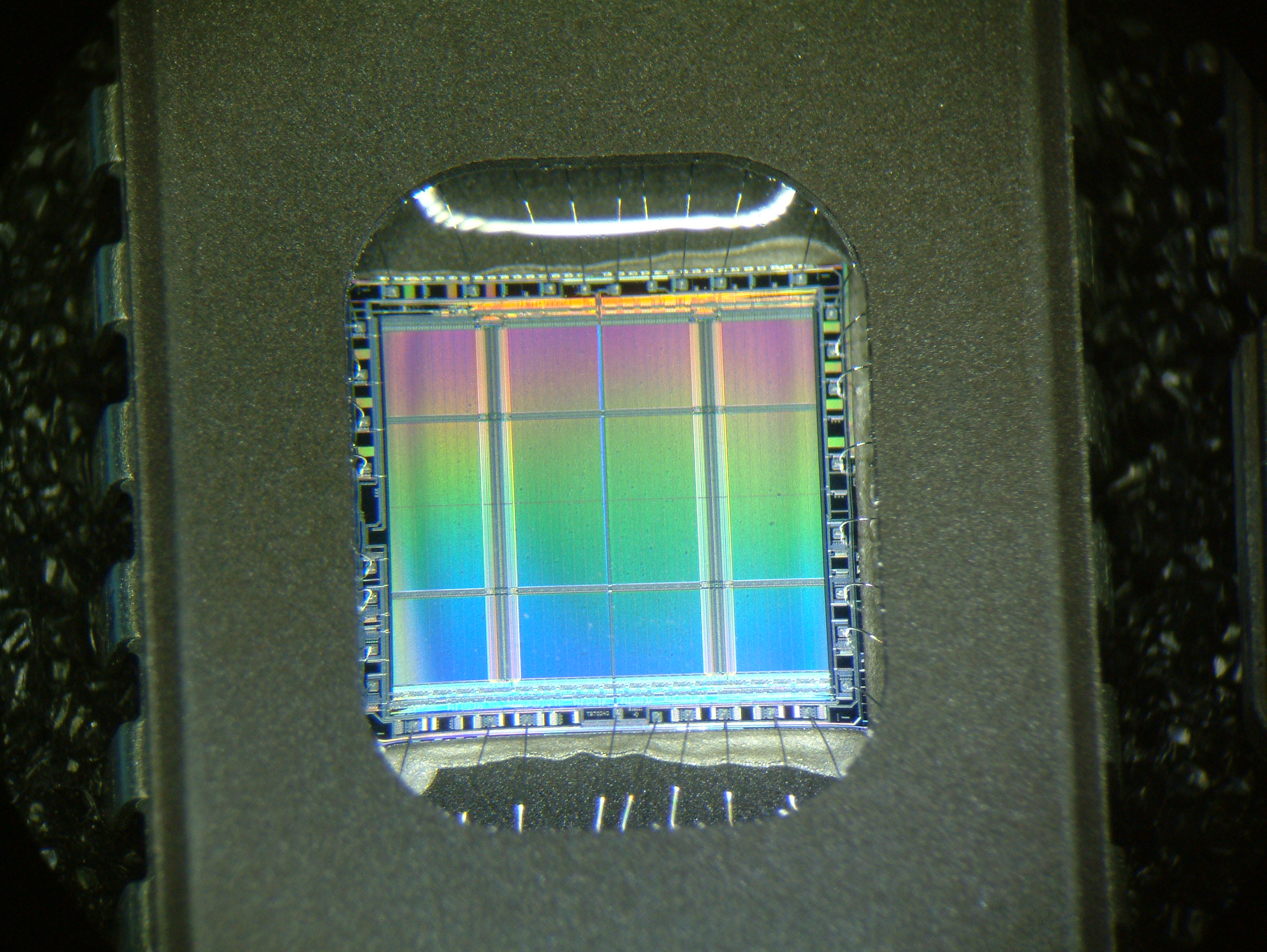
An EPROM: the Texas Instruments TMS27C040, a CMOS chip with 4 megabits of storage and 8-bit output (shown here in a 600-mil ceramic dual-in-line package). The TMS27C040 operates at 5 volts, but must be programmed at 13 volts.

An EPROM (rarely EROM), or erasable programmable read-only memory, is a type of programmable read-only memory (PROM) chip that retains its data when its power supply is switched off. Computer memory that can retrieve stored data after a power supply has been turned off and back on is called non-volatile. It is an array of floating-gate transistors individually programmed by an electronic device that supplies higher voltages than those normally used in digital circuits. Once programmed, an EPROM can be erased by exposing it to strong ultraviolet (UV) light source (such as from a mercury-vapor lamp). EPROMs are easily recognizable by the transparent fused quartz (or on later models, resin) window on the top of the package, through which the silicon chip is visible, and which permits exposure to ultraviolet light during erasing. It was invented by Dov Frohman in 1971.

== Operation ==
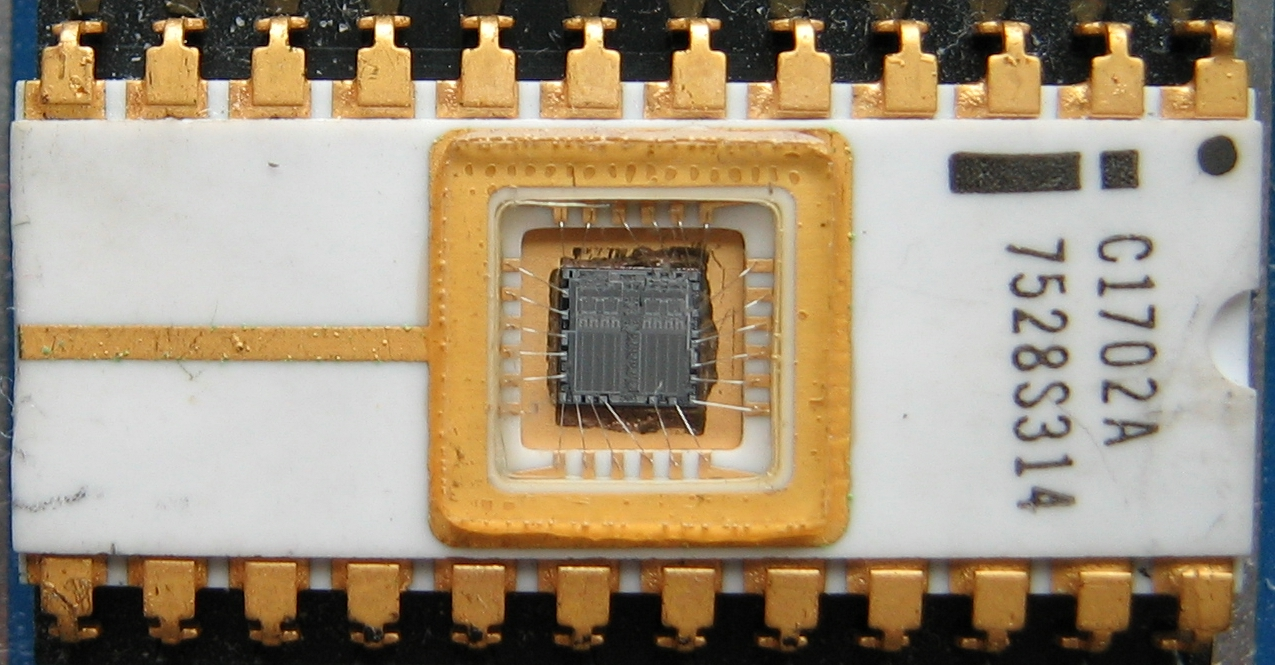
An Intel 1702A EPROM, one of the earliest EPROM types (1971), 256 by 8 bit. The small quartz window admits UV light for erasure.

Development of the EPROM memory cell started with investigation of faulty integrated circuits where the gate connections of transistors had broken. Stored charge on these isolated gates changes their threshold voltage.

Following the invention of the MOSFET (metal–oxide–semiconductor field-effect transistor) by Mohamed Atalla and Dawon Kahng at Bell Labs, presented in 1960, Frank Wanlass studied MOSFET structures in the early 1960s. In 1963, he noted the movement of charge through oxide onto a gate. While he did not pursue it, this idea would later become the basis for EPROM technology.

In 1967, Dawon Kahng and Simon Min Sze at Bell Labs proposed that the floating gate of a MOSFET could be used for the cell of a reprogrammable ROM (read-only memory). Building on this concept, Dov Frohman of Intel invented EPROM in 1971, and was awarded U.S. patent 3,660,819 in 1972. Frohman designed the Intel 1702, a 2048-bit EPROM, which was announced by Intel in 1971.

Each storage location of an EPROM consists of a single field-effect transistor. Each field-effect transistor consists of a channel in the semiconductor body of the device. Source and drain contacts are made to regions at the end of the channel. An insulating layer of oxide is grown over the channel, then a conductive (silicon or aluminum) gate electrode is deposited, and a further thick layer of oxide is deposited over the gate electrode. The floating-gate electrode has no connections to other parts of the integrated circuit and is completely insulated by the surrounding layers of oxide. A control gate electrode is deposited and further oxide covers it.

To retrieve data from the EPROM, the address represented by the values at the address pins of the EPROM is decoded and used to connect one word (usually an 8-bit byte) of storage to the output buffer amplifiers. Each bit of the word is a 1 or 0, depending on the storage transistor being switched on or off, conducting or non-conducting.

A cross-section of a floating-gate transistor

The switching state of the field-effect transistor is controlled by the voltage on the control gate of the transistor. Presence of a voltage on this gate creates a conductive channel in the transistor, switching it on. In effect, the stored charge on the floating gate allows the threshold voltage of the transistor to be programmed.

Storing data in the memory requires selecting a given address and applying a higher voltage to the transistors. This creates an avalanche discharge of electrons, which have enough energy to pass through the insulating oxide layer and accumulate on the gate electrode. When the high voltage is removed, the electrons are trapped on the electrode. Because of the high insulation value of the silicon oxide surrounding the gate, the stored charge cannot readily leak away and the data can be retained for decades.

The programming process is not electrically reversible. To erase the data stored in the array of transistors, ultraviolet light is directed onto the die. Photons of the UV light cause ionization within the silicon oxide, which allows the stored charge on the floating gate to dissipate. Since the whole memory array is exposed, all the memory is erased at the same time. The process takes several minutes for UV lamps of convenient sizes; sunlight would erase a chip in weeks, and indoor fluorescent lighting over several years. Generally, the EPROMs must be removed from equipment to be erased, since it is not usually practical to build in a UV lamp to erase parts in-circuit. Electrically Erasable Programmable Read-Only Memory (EEPROM) was developed to provide an electrical erase function and has now mostly displaced ultraviolet-erased parts.

== Details ==
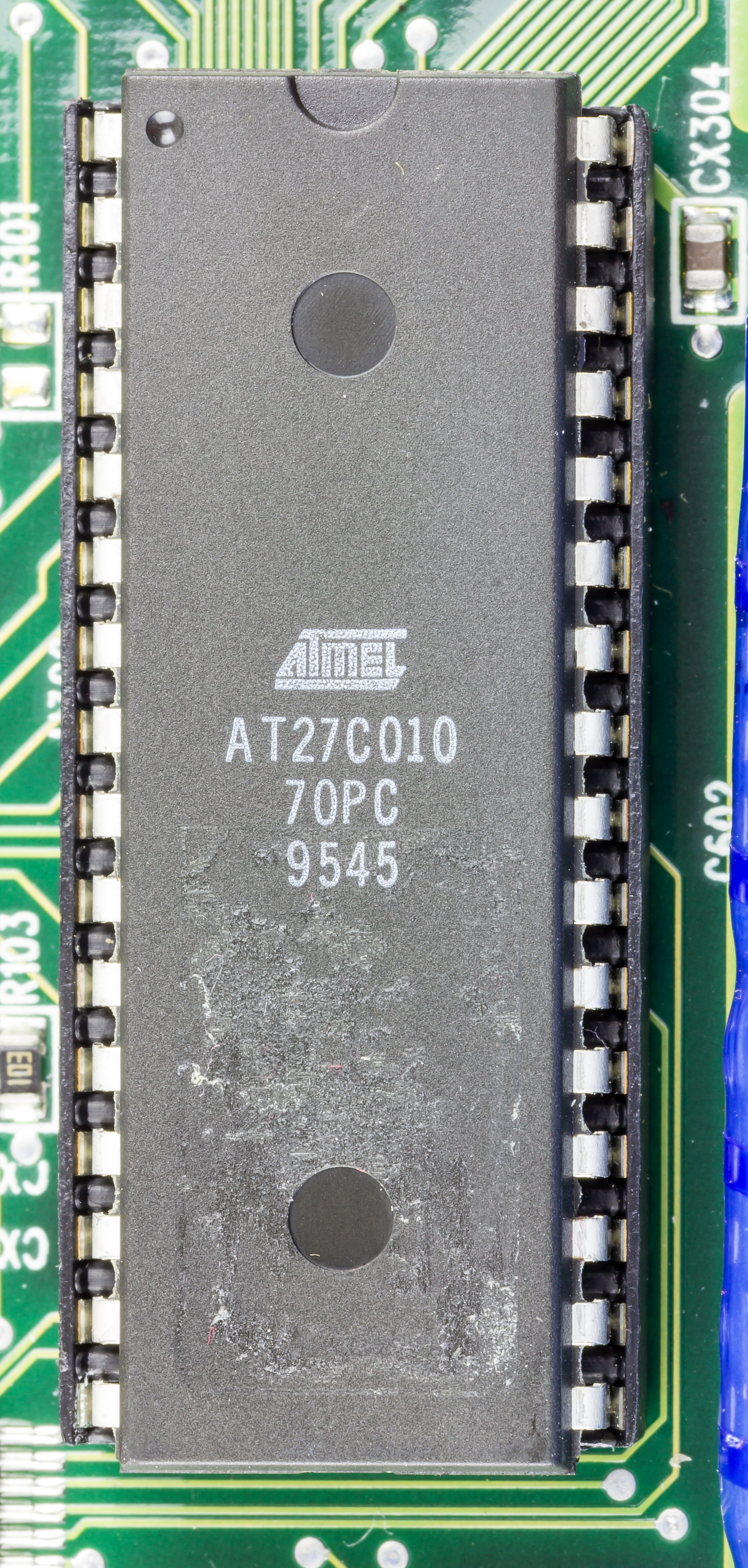
Atmel AT27C010 - an OTP EPROM

As the quartz window is expensive to make, OTP (one-time programmable) chips were introduced; here, the die is mounted in an opaque package so it cannot be erased after programming – this also eliminates the need to test the erase function, further reducing cost. OTP versions of both EPROMs and EPROM-based microcontrollers are manufactured. However, OTP EPROM (whether separate or part of a larger chip) is being increasingly replaced by EEPROM for small sizes, where the cell cost isn't too important, and flash for larger sizes.

A programmed EPROM retains its data for a minimum of ten to twenty years, with many still retaining data after 35 or more years, and can be read an unlimited number of times without affecting the lifetime. The erasing window must be kept covered with an opaque label to prevent accidental erasure by the UV found in sunlight or camera flashes. Old PC BIOS chips were often EPROMs, and the erasing window was often covered with an adhesive label containing the BIOS publisher's name, the BIOS revision, and a copyright notice. Often this label was foil-backed to ensure its opacity to UV.

Erasure of the EPROM begins to occur with wavelengths shorter than 400 nm. Exposure time for sunlight of one week or three years for room fluorescent lighting may cause erasure. The recommended erasure procedure is exposure to UV light at 253.7 nm of at least 15 Ws/cm^{2}, usually achieved in 20 to 30 minutes with the lamp at a distance of about 2.5 cm.

Erasure can also be accomplished with X-rays:

Erasure, however, has to be accomplished by non-electrical methods, since the gate electrode is not accessible electrically. Shining ultraviolet light on any part of an unpackaged device causes a photocurrent to flow from the floating gate back to the silicon substrate, thereby discharging the gate to its initial, uncharged condition (photoelectric effect). This method of erasure allows complete testing and correction of a complex memory array before the package is finally sealed. Once the package is sealed, information can still be erased by exposing it to X radiation in excess of 5*10^{4} rads, (Note: 500 J/kg) a dose which is easily attained with commercial X-ray generators.

In other words, to erase your EPROM, you would first have to X-ray it and then put it in an oven at about 600 degrees Celsius (to anneal semiconductor alterations caused by the X-rays). The effects of this process on the reliability of the part would have required extensive testing so they decided on the window instead.

EPROMs have a limited but large number of erase cycles; the silicon dioxide around the gates accumulates damage from each cycle, making the chip unreliable after several thousand cycles. EPROM programming is slow compared to other forms of memory. Because higher-density parts have little exposed oxide between the layers of interconnects and gate, ultraviolet erasing becomes less practical for very large memories. Even dust inside the package can prevent some cells from being erased.

== Application ==
For large volumes of parts (thousands of pieces or more), mask-programmed ROMs are the lowest cost devices to produce. However, these require many weeks lead time to make, since the artwork or design in an IC mask layer or photomask must be altered to store data on the ROMs. Initially, it was thought that the EPROM would be too expensive for mass production use and that it would be confined to development only. It was soon found that small-volume production was economical with EPROM parts, particularly when the advantage of rapid upgrades of firmware was considered.

Some microcontrollers, from before the era of EEPROMs and flash memory, use an on-chip EPROM to store their program. Such microcontrollers include some versions of the Intel 8048 and 8051, the Freescale 68HC11, and the "C" versions of the PIC microcontroller. Like EPROM chips, such microcontrollers came in windowed (expensive) versions that were used for debugging and program development. The same chip came in (somewhat cheaper) opaque OTP packages for production. Leaving the die of such a chip exposed to light can also change behavior in unexpected ways when moving from a windowed part used for development to a non-windowed part for production.

== EPROM generations, sizes and types ==
The first generation 1702 devices were fabricated with the p-MOS technology. They were powered with V_{CC} = V_{BB} = +5 V and V_{DD} = V_{GG} = -9 V in Read mode, and with V_{DD} = V_{GG} = -47 V in Programming mode.

The second generation 2704 / 2708 devices switched to n-MOS technology and to three-rail V_{CC} = +5 V, V_{BB} = -5 V, V_{DD} = +12 V power supply with V_{PP} = 12 V and a +25 V pulse in Programming mode.

The third generation 2716 / 2732 devices upgraded to an evolved n-MOS technology that required only a single-rail V_{CC} = +5 V power supply for read operations, and a single V_{PP} = +25 V programming voltage without pulse. The unneeded V_{BB} and V_{DD} pins were reused for additional address bits allowing larger capacities (2716 / 2732) in the same 24-pin package, and even larger capacities with larger packages. Later the decreased cost of the CMOS technology allowed the same devices to be fabricated using it, adding the letter "C" to the device numbers (27xx(x) are n-MOS and 27Cxx(x) are CMOS).

While the industry was heading towards a standard pinout and architecture of the 27xx EPROMs, Texas Instruments (TI) introduced a few types that are now considered non-standard. While the TMS2716 was a three-rail device like preceding types, their TMS2516 was a single +5V EPROM like the 2716 offered by the other chip foundries. TI then released the TMS2532 and TMS2564, both single +5V devices, but with pinouts incompatible with the 2732 and 2764.

While parts of the same size from different manufacturers are compatible in read mode, different manufacturers added different and sometimes multiple programming modes leading to subtle differences in the programming process. This prompted larger capacity devices to introduce a "signature mode", allowing the manufacturer and device to be identified by the EPROM programmer. It was implemented by forcing +12 V on pin A9 and reading out two bytes of data. However, as this was not universal, programmer software also would allow manual setting of the manufacturer and device type of the chip to ensure proper programming.

EPROM Type	Year	Size bits	Size bytes	Word size	Technology
1702, 1702A	1971	2 Kibit	256 B	8 bit	PMOS
2704	1975	4 Kibit	512 B	8 bit	NMOS
S6834		4 Kibit	512 B	8 bit	PMOS
IM6654		4 Kibit	512 B	8 bit	CMOS
2708	1975	8 Kibit	1 KiB	8 bit	NMOS
2716, 27C16, TMS2716, 2516	1977	16 Kibit	2 KiB	8 bit	NMOS/CMOS
2732, 27C32, 2532	1979	32 Kibit	4 KiB	8 bit	NMOS/CMOS
2764, 27C64, 2564	1981	64 Kibit	8 KiB	8 bit	NMOS/CMOS
27128, 27C128	1982	128 Kibit	16 KiB	8 bit	NMOS/CMOS
27256, 27C256	1983	256 Kibit	32 KiB	8 bit	NMOS/CMOS
27512, 27C512	1984	512 Kibit	64 KiB	8 bit	NMOS/CMOS
27C010, 27C100	1985/86	1 Mibit	128 KiB	8 bit	CMOS
27C1024	1986	1 Mibit	128 KiB	16 bit	CMOS
27C020	1986/87	2 Mibit	256 KiB	8 bit	CMOS
27C2048	1987	2 Mibit	256 KiB	16 bit	CMOS
27C040, 27C4001	1987	4 Mibit	512 KiB	8 bit	CMOS
27C4096	1988	4 Mibit	512 KiB	16 bit	CMOS
27C080, 27C801	1988/89	8 Mibit	1 MiB	8 bit	CMOS
27C800	1989/90	8 Mibit	1 MiB	8/16 bit	CMOS
27C160	1990/91	16 Mibit	2 MiB	8/16 bit	CMOS
27C320	1991/92	32 Mibit	4 MiB	8/16 bit	CMOS
27C322	1991/92	32 Mibit	4 MiB	16 bit	CMOS

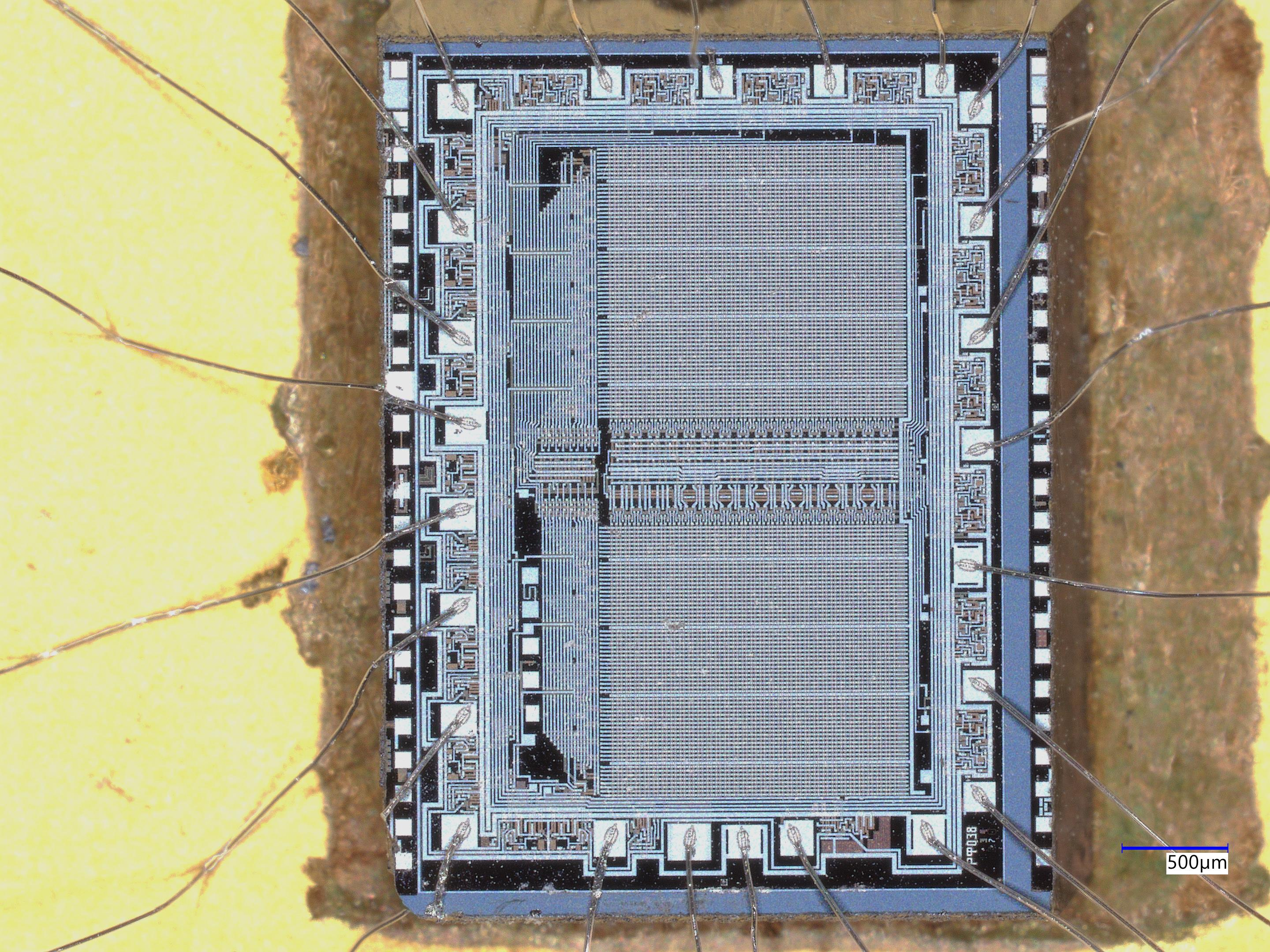
K573RF1

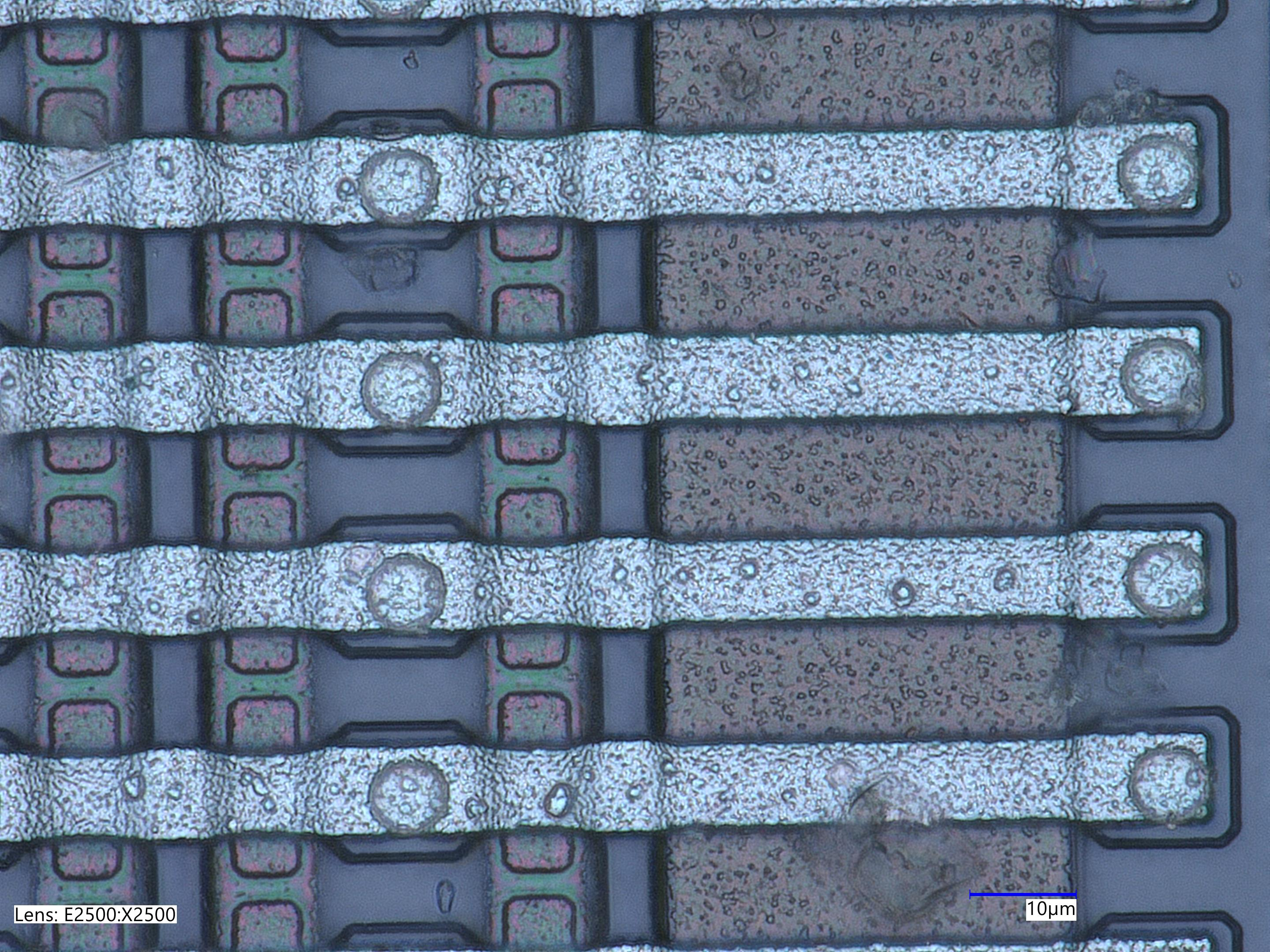
EPROM 8kbit - detail of 4 bits

== Gallery ==
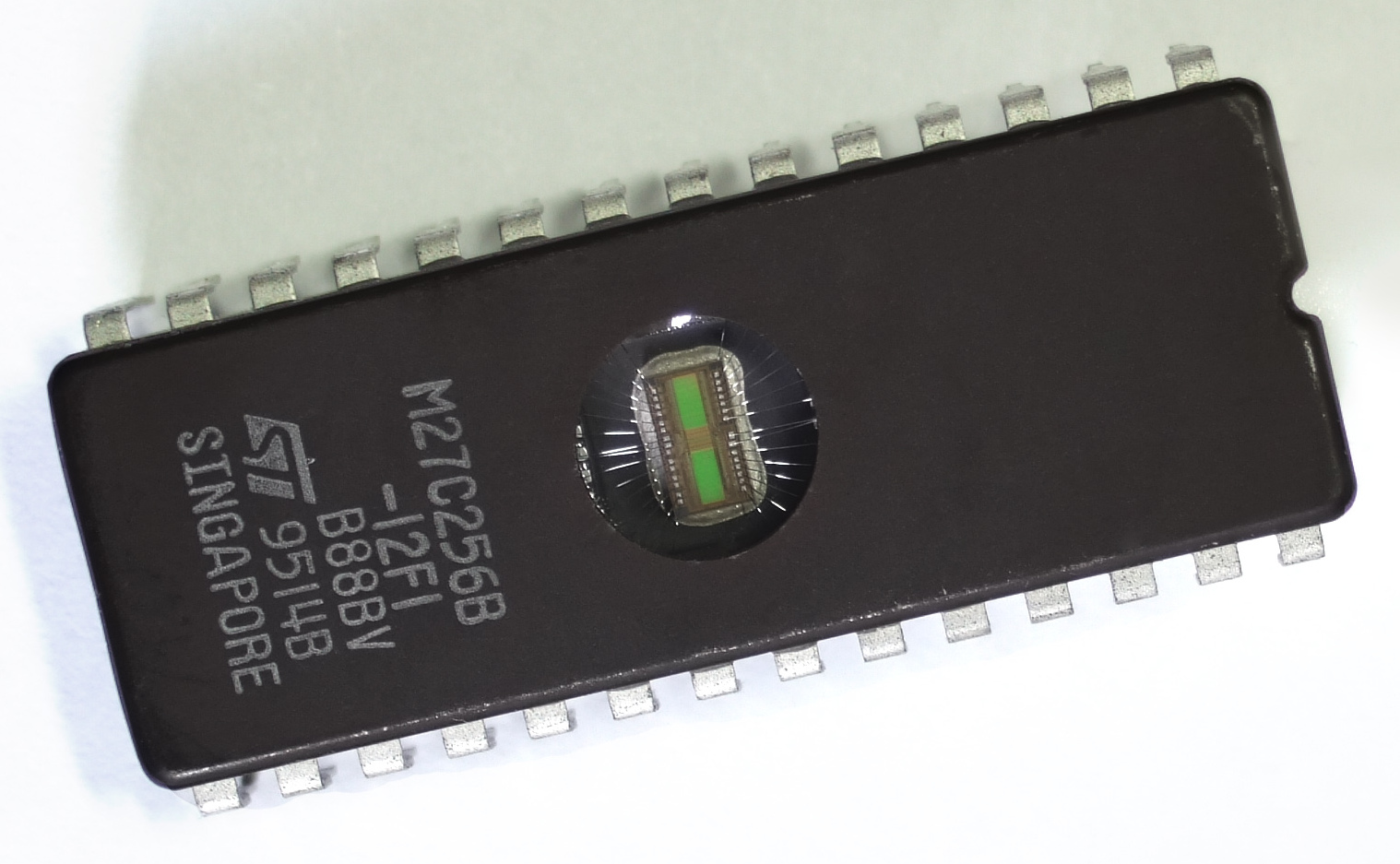
A 32 KB (256 Kbit) EPROM. The -12 suffix indicates this device has a 120 nanosecond access time.

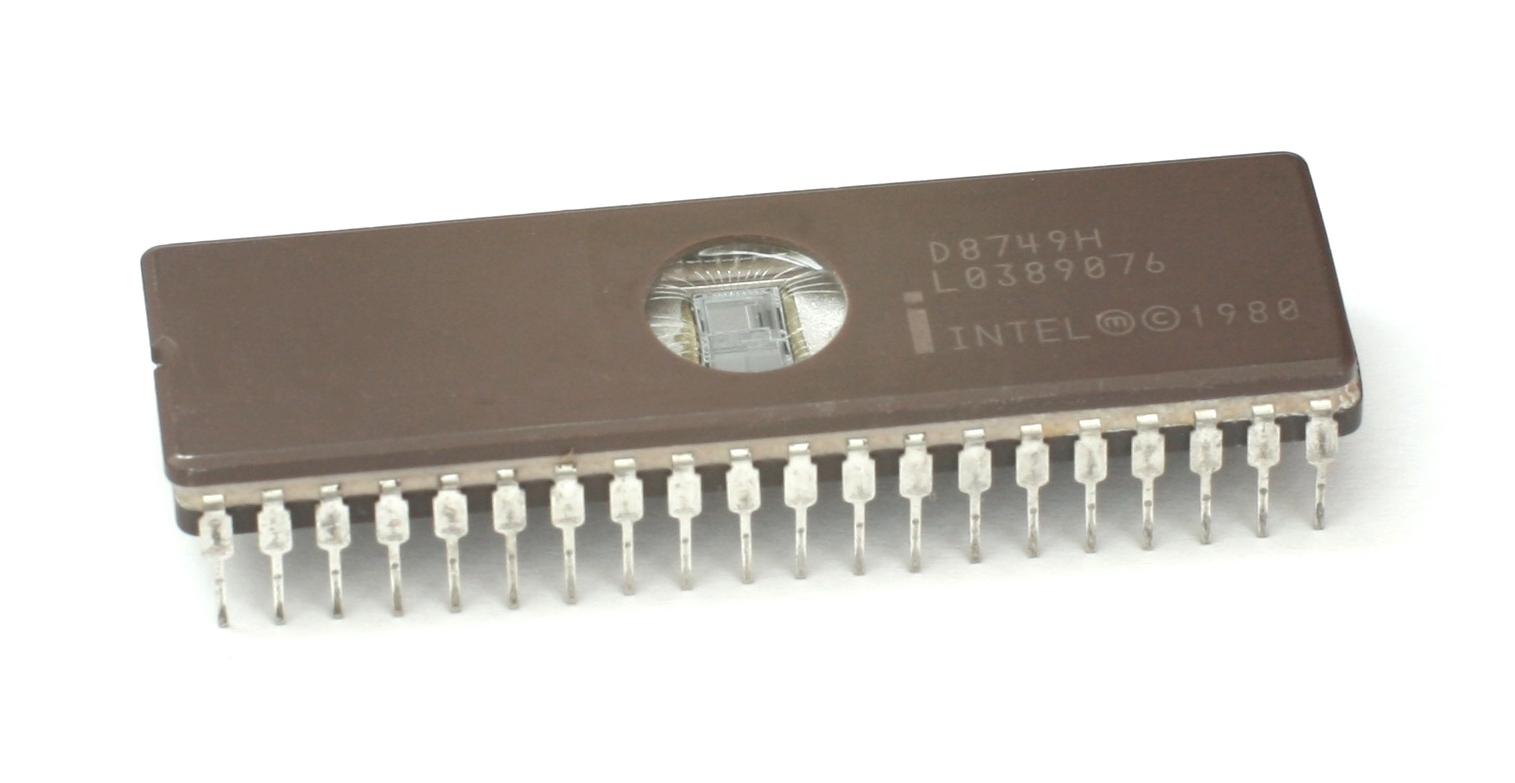
This 8749 Microcontroller stores its program in an internal EPROM.

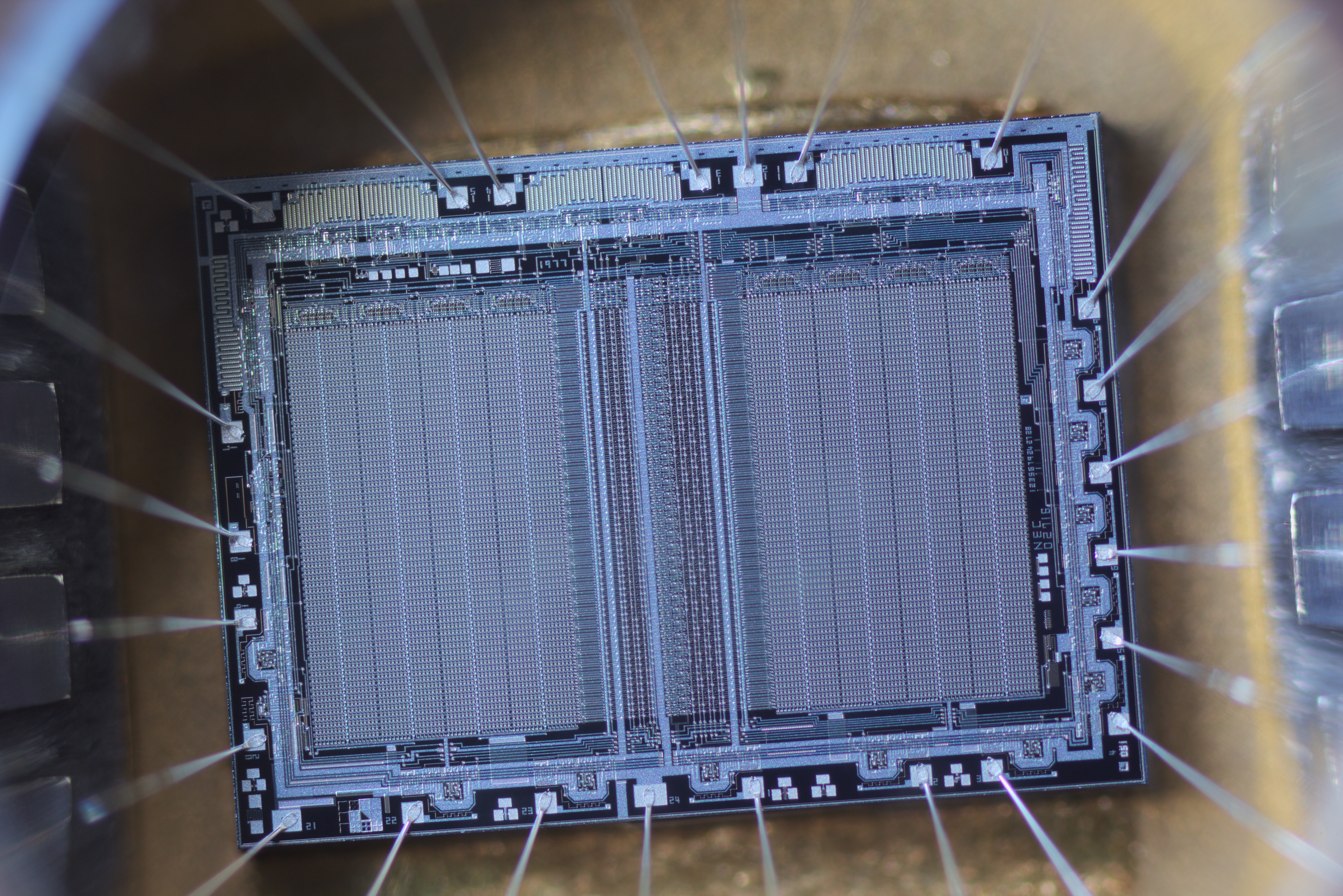
NEC 02716, 16 KBit EPROM

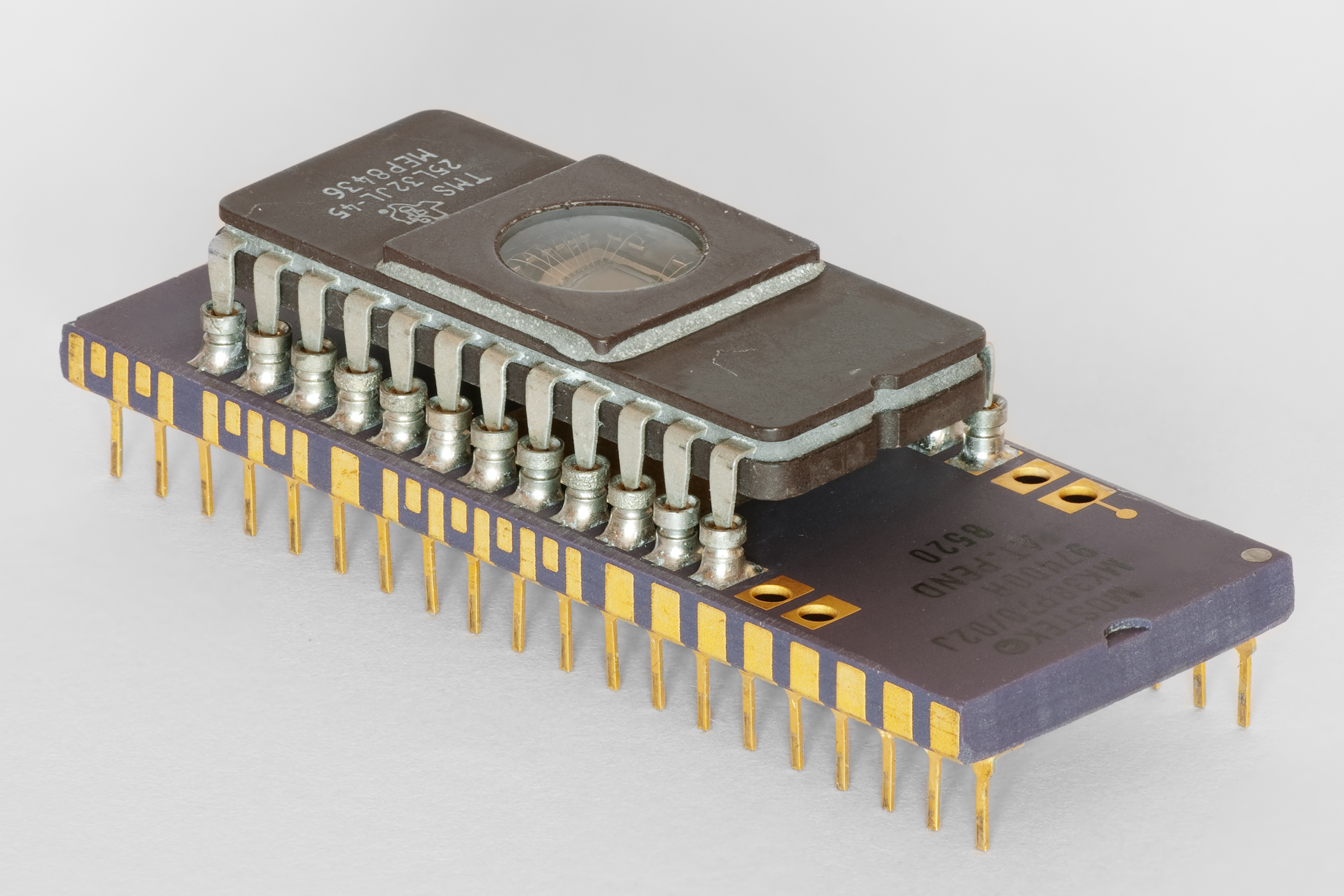
Piggyback microcontroller from MOSTEK with attached EPROM

== See also ==
- Programmable ROM
- EEPROM
- Flash memory
- Intel HEX - File format
- SREC - File format
- Programmer (hardware)

== Bibliography ==
- Sah, Chih-Tang (1991), Fundamentals of solid-state electronics, World Scientific, ISBN 981-02-0637-2.
