= Antifuse =

Electrical device

An antifuse is an electrical device that performs the opposite function to a fuse. Whereas a fuse starts with a low resistance and is designed to permanently break or open an electrically conductive path (typically when the current through the path exceeds a specified limit), an antifuse starts with a high resistance—an open circuit—and programming it converts it into a permanent electrically conductive path (typically when the voltage across the antifuse exceeds a certain level). This technology has many applications. Antifuses are best known for their use in mini-light (or miniature) style low-voltage Christmas tree lights.

== Christmas tree lights ==
Low-voltage lights cannot handle the full voltage typical to a residential circuit and are wired in series, unlike the larger, traditional, C7 and C9 style lights which are wired in parallel and are rated to operate directly at mains/residential voltage. Since a blown bulb in a series circuit opens the entire circuit, a series string is rendered inoperable by a single lamp failure.

Because of this, each bulb has an antifuse installed within it, normally as an internal shunt wire. When the bulb blows, the entire mains voltage appears across the single blown lamp. This rapidly causes the antifuse to short out the blown bulb, allowing the series circuit to resume functioning, albeit with a larger proportion of the mains voltage now applied to each of the remaining lamps. The antifuse is made using wire with a high resistance coating and this wire is coiled over the two vertical filament support wires inside the bulb. The insulation of the antifuse wire withstands the ordinary low voltage imposed across a functioning lamp but rapidly breaks down under the full mains voltage, giving the antifuse action.

As more bulbs fail in the string, the voltage across each of the remaining bulbs increases, making them progressively more likely to fail. Current through the strand also rises, so strands typically incorporate a regular fuse to protect against the possibility of severe overcurrent if too many bulbs fail. In some cases this function is performed by a "fuse bulb" with no antifuse and a slightly different rating so it blows first as the current gets too high.

== Antifuses in integrated circuits ==
Antifuses are widely used to permanently program integrated circuits. Antifuses may be used in programmable read-only memory (PROM). Each bit contains both a fuse and an anti-fuse and is programmed by triggering one of the two. This programming, performed after manufacturing, is permanent and irreversible and is a means of achieving what is referred to as "one-time programming" (OTP).

Certain programmable logic devices (PLDs), such as structured ASICs, use fuse technology to configure logic circuits and create a customized design from a standard IC design. Antifuse PLDs are one-time programmable in contrast to other PLDs that are SRAM-based and which may be reprogrammed to fix logic bugs or add new functions. Antifuse PLDs have advantages over SRAM-based PLDs in that like ASICs, they do not need to be configured each time power is applied. They may be less susceptible to alpha particles which can cause circuits to malfunction. Also, circuits built via the antifuse's permanent conductive paths may be faster than similar circuits implemented in PLDs using SRAM technology.

=== Dielectric antifuses ===
Dielectric anti-fuses employ a very thin oxide barrier between a pair of conductors. Formation of the conductive channel is performed by a dielectric breakdown forced by a high-voltage pulse. Dielectric antifuses are usually employed in CMOS and BiCMOS processes as the required oxide layer thickness is lower than those available in bipolar processes.

=== Amorphous silicon antifuses ===
One approach for the ICs that use antifuse technology employs a thin barrier of non-conducting amorphous silicon between two metal conductors. When a sufficiently high voltage is applied across the amorphous silicon it is turned into a polycrystalline silicon-metal alloy with a low resistance, which is conductive.

Amorphous silicon is a material usually not used in either bipolar or CMOS processes and requires an additional manufacturing step.

The antifuse is usually triggered using an approximately 5 mA current. With a poly-diffusion antifuse, the high current density creates heat, which melts a thin insulating layer between polysilicon and diffusion electrodes, creating a permanent resistive silicon link.

=== Zener antifuses ===
Zener diodes can be used as antifuses. The p-n junction that serves as such a diode is overloaded with a current spike and overheated. At temperatures above 100 °C and current densities above 10^{5} A/cm^{2} the metallization undergoes electromigration and forms spikes through the junction, shorting it out; this process is known as Zener zap in the industry. The spike is formed on and slightly below the silicon surface, just below the passivation layer without damaging it. The conductive shunt therefore does not compromise the integrity and reliability of the semiconductor device. Typically a few-millisecond pulse at 100-200 mA is sufficient for common bipolar devices, for a non-optimized antifuse structure; specialized structures will have lower power demands. The resulting resistance of the junction is in the range of 10 ohms.

Zener zap is frequently employed in mixed-signal circuits for trimming values of analog components. For example, a precision resistor can be manufactured by forming several series resistors with Zeners in parallel (oriented to be nonconductive during normal operation of the device) and then shorting selected Zeners to shunt the unwanted resistors. By this approach, it is possible only to lower the value of the resulting resistor. It is therefore necessary to shift the manufacturing tolerances so that the lowest-value typically made is equal to or larger than the desired value. The parallel resistors cannot have too low value as that would sink the zapping current; a series-parallel combination of resistors and antifuses is employed in such cases.

== Street-lighting (obsolete) ==
In a similar fashion to that of Christmas tree lights, before the advent of high-intensity discharge lamps, street light circuits using incandescent light bulbs were often operated as high-voltage series circuits. Each individual street-lamp was equipped with a film cutout; a small disk of insulating film that separated two contacts connected to the two wires leading to the lamp. In the same fashion as with the Christmas lights described above, if the lamp failed, the entire voltage of the street lighting circuit (thousands of volts) was imposed across the insulating film in the cutout, causing it to rupture. In this way, the failed lamp was bypassed and illumination restored to the rest of the street.

Unlike Christmas lights, the circuit usually contained an automatic device to regulate the electric current flowing in the circuit, such as a constant-current transformer. As each series lamp burned out and was shorted out, the AC current regulator reduced the voltage, which kept each remaining bulb operating at its normal voltage, current, brightness, and life expectancy. When the failed lamp was finally replaced, a new piece of film was also installed, again separating the electrical contacts in the cutout. This style of street lighting was recognizable by the large porcelain insulator that separated the lamp and reflector from the light's mounting arm; the insulator was necessary because the two contacts in the lamp's base may have routinely operated at a potential of several thousands of volts above ground/earth.

The same mechanism (a film-disc cutout) is used broadly in applications where series lighting is desired, such as airfield runway and taxiway lights.

== See also ==
- Crowbar (circuit)
- Diac
- Lightning arrester
- Transient voltage suppression diode
- Varistor
