= Intel HEX =

File format for conveying binary information

Intel hex
- Filename extensions: General-purpose:.hex, .mcs, .int, .ihex, .ihe, .ihx Platform-specific:.h80, .h86, .a43, .a90 Split, banked, or paged:.hxl–.hxh, .h00–.h15, .p00–.pff Binary or Intel hex:.obj, .obl, .obh, .rom, .eep

Intel hexadecimal object file format, Intel hex format or Intellec Hex is a file format that conveys binary information in ASCII text form, making it possible to store on non-binary media such as paper tape, punch cards, etc., to display on text terminals or be printed on line-oriented printers. The format is commonly used for programming microcontrollers, EPROMs, and other types of programmable logic devices and hardware emulators. In a typical application, a compiler or assembler converts a program's source code (such as in C or assembly language) to machine code and outputs it into an object or executable file in hexadecimal (or binary) format. In some applications, the Intel hex format is also used as a container format holding packets of stream data. Common file extensions used for the resulting files are .HEX or .H86. The HEX file is then read by a programmer to write the machine code into a PROM or is transferred to the target system for loading and execution. There are various tools to convert files between hexadecimal and binary format (i.e. HEX2BIN), and vice versa (i.e. OBJHEX, OH, OHX, BIN2HEX). GNU's objcopy supports conversion of Intel HEX both to and from other supported formats.

== History ==
The Intel hex format was originally designed for Intel's Intellec Microcomputer Development Systems (MDS) in 1973 in order to load and execute programs from paper tape. It was also used to specify memory contents to Intel for ROM production, which previously had to be encoded in the much less efficient BNPF (Begin-Negative-Positive-Finish) format. In 1973, Intel's "software group" consisted only of Bill Byerly and Kenneth Burgett, and Gary Kildall as an external consultant doing business as Microcomputer Applications Associates (MAA) and founding Digital Research in 1974. Beginning in 1975, the format was utilized by Intellec Series II ISIS-II systems supporting diskette drives, with files using the file extension HEX. Many PROM and EPROM programming devices accept this format.

== Format ==
Intel HEX consists of lines of ASCII text that are separated by line feed or carriage return characters or both. Each text line contains uppercase hexadecimal characters that encode multiple binary numbers. The binary numbers may represent data, memory addresses, or other values, depending on their position in the line and the type and length of the line. Each text line is called a record.

=== Record structure ===
A record (line of text) consists of six fields (parts) that appear in order from left to right:

1. Start code, one character, an ASCII colon ':'. All characters preceding this symbol in a record should be ignored. In fact, very early versions of the specification even asked for a minimum of 25 NUL characters to precede the first record and follow the last one, owing to the format's origins as a paper tape format which required some tape leadin and leadout for handling. However, as this was a little known part of the specification, not all software written copes with this correctly. It allows to store other related information in the same file (and even the same line), a facility used by various software development utilities to store symbol tables or additional comments, and third-party extensions using other characters as start code like the digits '0'..'9' by Intel and Keil, '$' by Mostek, or '!', '@', '#', '\', '&' and ';' by TDL. By convention, '//' is often used for comments. Neither of these extensions may contain any ':' characters as part of the payload.
2. Byte count, two hex digits (one hex digit pair), indicating the number of bytes (hex digit pairs) in the data field. The maximum byte count is 255 (0xFF). The values of 8 (0x08), 16 (0x10) and 32 (0x20) are commonly used byte counts. Not all software copes with counts larger than 16.
3. Address, four hex digits, representing the 16-bit beginning memory address offset of the data. The physical address of the data is computed by adding this offset to a previously established base address, thus allowing memory addressing beyond the 64 kilobyte limit of 16-bit addresses. The base address, which defaults to zero, can be changed by various types of records. Base addresses and address offsets are always expressed as big endian values.
4. Record type (see record types below), two hex digits, 00 to 05, defining the meaning of the data field.
5. Data, a sequence of n bytes of data, represented by 2n hex digits. Some records omit this field (n equals zero). The meaning and interpretation of data bytes depends on the application. (4-bit data will either have to be stored in the lower or upper half of the bytes, that is, one byte holds only one addressable data item.)
6. Checksum, two hex digits, a computed value that can be used to verify the record has no errors.

==== Color legend ====
As a visual aid, the fields of Intel HEX records are colored throughout this article as follows:

Start code Byte count Address Record type Data Checksum

==== Checksum calculation ====
A record's checksum byte is the two's complement of the least significant byte (LSB) of the sum of all decoded byte values in the record preceding the checksum. It is computed by summing the decoded byte values and extracting the LSB of the sum (i.e., the data checksum), and then calculating the two's complement of the LSB (e.g., by inverting its bits and adding one).

For example, in the case of the record :0300300002337A1E, the sum of the decoded byte values is 03 + 00 + 30 + 00 + 02 + 33 + 7A = E2, which has LSB value E2. The two's complement of E2 is 1E, which is the checksum byte appearing at the end of the record.

The validity of a record can be checked by computing its checksum and verifying that the computed checksum equals the checksum appearing in the record; an error is indicated if the checksums differ. Since the record's checksum byte is the two's complement — and therefore the additive inverse — of the data checksum, this process can be reduced to summing all decoded byte values, including the record's checksum, and verifying that the LSB of the sum is zero. When applied to the preceding example, this method produces the following result: 03 + 00 + 30 + 00 + 02 + 33 + 7A + 1E = 100, which has LSB value 00.

=== Text line terminators ===
Intel HEX records are usually separated by one or more ASCII line termination characters so that each record appears alone on a text line. This enhances readability by visually delimiting the records and it also provides padding between records that can be used to improve machine parsing efficiency. However, the line termination characters are optional, as the ':' is used to detect the start of a record.

Programs that create HEX records typically use line termination characters that conform to the conventions of their operating systems. For example, Linux programs use a single LF (line feed, hex value 0A) character to terminate lines, whereas Windows programs use a CR (carriage return, hex value 0D) followed by a LF.

=== Record types ===
Intel HEX has six standard record types:

Hex code	Record type	Description	Example
00	Data	The byte count specifies number of data bytes in the record. The example has 0B (eleven) data bytes. The 16-bit starting address for the data (in the example at addresses beginning at 0010) and the data (61, 64, 64, 72, 65, 73, 73, 20, 67, 61, 70).	:0B0010006164647265737320676170A7
01	End Of File	Must occur exactly once per file in the last record of the file. The byte count is 00, the address field is typically 0000 and the data field is omitted.	:00000001FF
02	Extended Segment Address	The byte count is always 02, the address field (typically 0000) is ignored and the data field contains a 16-bit segment base address. This is multiplied by 16 and added to each subsequent data record address to form the starting address for the data. This allows addressing up to one mebibyte (1048576 bytes) of address space.	:020000021200EA
03	Start Segment Address	For 80x86 processors, specifies the starting execution address. The byte count is always 04, the address field is 0000 and the first two data bytes are the CS value, the latter two are the IP value. The execution should start at this address.	:0400000300003800C1
04	Extended Linear Address	Allows for 32 bit addressing (up to 4 GiB). The byte count is always 02 and the address field is ignored (typically 0000). The two data bytes (big endian) specify the upper 16 bits of the 32 bit absolute address for all subsequent type 00 records; these upper address bits apply until the next 04 record. The absolute address for a type 00 record is formed by combining the upper 16 address bits of the most recent 04 record with the low 16 address bits of the 00 record. If a type 00 record is not preceded by any type 04 records then its upper 16 address bits default to 0000.	:020000040800F2
05	Start Linear Address	The byte count is always 04, the address field is 0000. The four data bytes represent a 32-bit address value (big endian). In the case of CPUs that support it, this 32-bit address is the address at which execution should start.	:04000005000000CD2A

Other record types have been used for variants, including 06 ('blinky' messages / transmission protocol container) by Wayne and Layne, 0A (block start), 0B (block end), 0C (padded data), 0D (custom data) and 0E (other data) by the BBC/Micro:bit Educational Foundation, and 81 (data in code segment), 82 (data in data segment), 83 (data in stack segment), 84 (data in extra segment), 85 (paragraph address for absolute code segment), 86 (paragraph address for absolute data segment), 87 (paragraph address for absolute stack segment) and 88 (paragraph address for absolute extra segment) by Digital Research.

=== Named formats ===
The original 4-bit/8-bit Intellec Hex Paper Tape Format and Intellec Hex Computer Punched Card Format in 1973/1974 supported only one record type 00. This was expanded around 1975 to also support record type 01. Sometimes called symbolic hexadecimal format, it could include an optional header containing a symbol table for symbolic debugging, all characters in a record preceding the colon are ignored.

Around 1978, Intel introduced the new record types 02 and 03 (to add support for the segmented address space of the then-new 8086/8088 processors) in their Extended Intellec Hex Format.

Special names are sometimes used to denote the formats of HEX files that employ specific subsets of record types. For example:

- I8HEX (aka HEX-80) files use only record types 00 and 01
- I16HEX (aka HEX-86) files use only record types 00 through 03
- I32HEX (aka HEX-386) files use only record types 00, 01, 04, and 05

== File example ==
This example shows a file that has four data records followed by an end-of-file record:

:10010000214601360121470136007EFE09D2190140
:100110002146017E17C20001FF5F16002148011928
:10012000194E79234623965778239EDA3F01B2CAA7
:100130003F0156702B5E712B722B732146013421C7
:00000001FF

Start code Byte count Address Record type Data Checksum

== Variants ==
Besides Intel's own extension, several third-parties have also defined variants and extensions of the Intel hex format, including Digital Research (as in the so-called "Digital Research hex format"), Zilog, Mostek, TDL, Texas Instruments, Microchip, c't, Wayne and Layne, and BBC/Micro:bit Educational Foundation (with its "Universal Hex Format"). These can have information on program entry points and register contents, a swapped byte order in the data fields, fill values for unused areas, fuse bits, and other differences.

The Digital Research hex format for 8086 processors supports segment information by adding record types to distinguish between code, data, stack, and extra segments.

Most assemblers for CP/M-80 (and also XASM09 for the Motorola 6809) don't use record type 01h to indicate the end of a file, but use a zero-length data type 00h entry instead. This eases the concatenation of multiple hex files.

Texas Instruments defines a variant where addresses are based on the bit-width of a processor's registers, not bytes.

Microchip defines variants INTHX8S (INHX8L, INHX8H), INHX8M, INHX16 (INHX16M) and INHX32 for their PIC microcontrollers.

Alfred Arnold's cross-macro-assembler AS, Werner Hennig-Roleff's 8051-emulator SIM51, and Matthias R. Paul's cross-converter BINTEL are also known to define extensions to the Intel hex format.

== See also ==
- Binary-to-text encoding, a survey and comparison of encoding algorithms
- Text-based protocol
- MOS Technology file format
- Motorola S-record hex format
- Tektronix hex format
- Texas Instruments TI-TXT (TI Text)
- Intel Micro Computer Set (MCS)
- Object file
