= Oscillator start-up timer =

An oscillator start-up timer (OST) is a module used by some microcontrollers to keep the device reset until the crystal oscillator is stable. When a crystal oscillator starts up, its frequency is not constant, which causes the clock frequency to be non-constant. This would cause timing errors, leading to many problems. An oscillator start-up timer ensures that the device only operates when the oscillator generates a stable clock frequency. The PIC microcontroller's oscillator start-up timer holds the device's reset for a 1024-oscillator-cycle delay to allow the oscillator to stabilize.

== See also ==
- Power-on reset
- Watchdog timer
- Low-voltage detect
