= LVD =

LVD may refer to:

- Low-voltage differential signaling, an electrical signaling method that can run at very high speeds over inexpensive twisted-pair copper cables.
- Low Voltage Directive, European directive 2006/95/EC for the safety of electrical equipment sold within the European Union.
- Low-voltage detect is a microcontroller technology that asserts a RESET when Vcc falls below Vref.
- Large Volume Detector, particle physics experiment situated in Italy.
- Liquid vapor display, display technology.
- Ludwig Von Drake, Disney character
