= Command-loss timer =

Watchdog timer within spacecraft communication systems

In spacecraft, a command-loss timer (CLT) is a software timer within the command and data system (CDS) which is restarted every time a command is received from Earth. If the CLT times out, it is assumed that the spacecraft's receiver has failed to reliably receive messages and, in response, the CDS will attempt to restore communication or perform safing procedures, or both. A CLT is effectively a software watchdog timer which, upon timeout, initiates corrective actions that will in some cases swap to redundant communication hardware.

Robotic spacecraft are accessible to human operators only by command telemetry. Consequently, a spacecraft need to be self-reliant, because its embedded systems cannot be physically accessed if a communication fault occurs. Without a CLT, such faults would result in the spacecraft becoming permanently disabled.

== Other uses ==
Command Loss Timers are not limited to spacecraft, as any scientific instrument that is in a situation where remote command could be lost could use this safety measure.

This feature is common with devices connected over the Internet, but not all Internet connected devices use it.

== See also ==
- Safe mode (spacecraft)
