= Holtek =

Holtek Semiconductor Inc. 盛群半導體股份有限公司

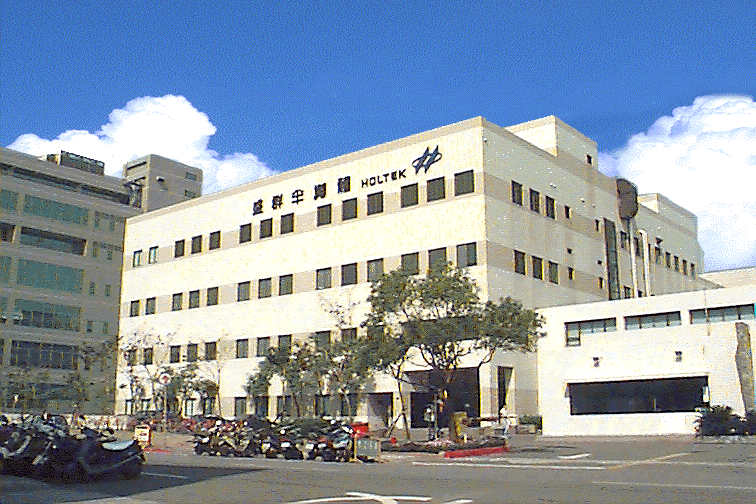
- Holtek Semiconductor headquarters (2017)
- Company type: Public
- Industry: Semiconductor devices
- Founded: 1983
- Headquarters: Hsinchu, Taiwan
- Key people: Keith Wu, Chairperson; Armstrong, President; Chang Chi, Exec Vice President; Alexpan, Spokesperson
- Products: Microcontrollers, Memory; Computer peripheral Remote Control, Telecom; Power Management, Display Driver
- Revenue: 8 Million Taiwan Dollars for 2024
- Number of employees: 850 +

Holtek Semiconductor (Chinese: 盛群半導體股份有限公司) is a Taiwan-based semiconductor design centre and provider with its headquarters and design operations based in the Hsinchu Science Park in Taiwan, and has sales offices located the United States and India. Holtek's design focus is in both 32-bit and 8-bit along with Touch microcontroller development, and as of 2022 the firm employed 631 employees. Holtek also designs and provides peripheral semiconductor products such as remote control, telecommunication, power management, computer peripheral, and memory devices. Holtek's device application area is concentrated in the consumer product field such as household appliances, computer peripheral products, remote controllers, leisure products, medical equipment as well as industrial controllers. Holtek microcontrollers are in home appliances including brands such as Philips, Siemens, Märklin and Japanese brands such as Futaba and Sony.

== History ==
Holtek Semiconductor was established as a design house in Taipei in 1983. From the design of remote control, telecom and voice/music devices, the company moved into microcontroller design.

In 1988 the company moved to the Hsinchu Science Park under the name of Holtek Microelectronics and began also its combined manufacturing and design operations.

In 1998 Holtek Semiconductor Inc. became a pure design house with its device manufacturing contracted out. The decision to move out of manufacturing and focus on only design reflected many similar companies.

Currently opened new offices in India Bengaluru / New Delhi for local support / global support.

== Products ==
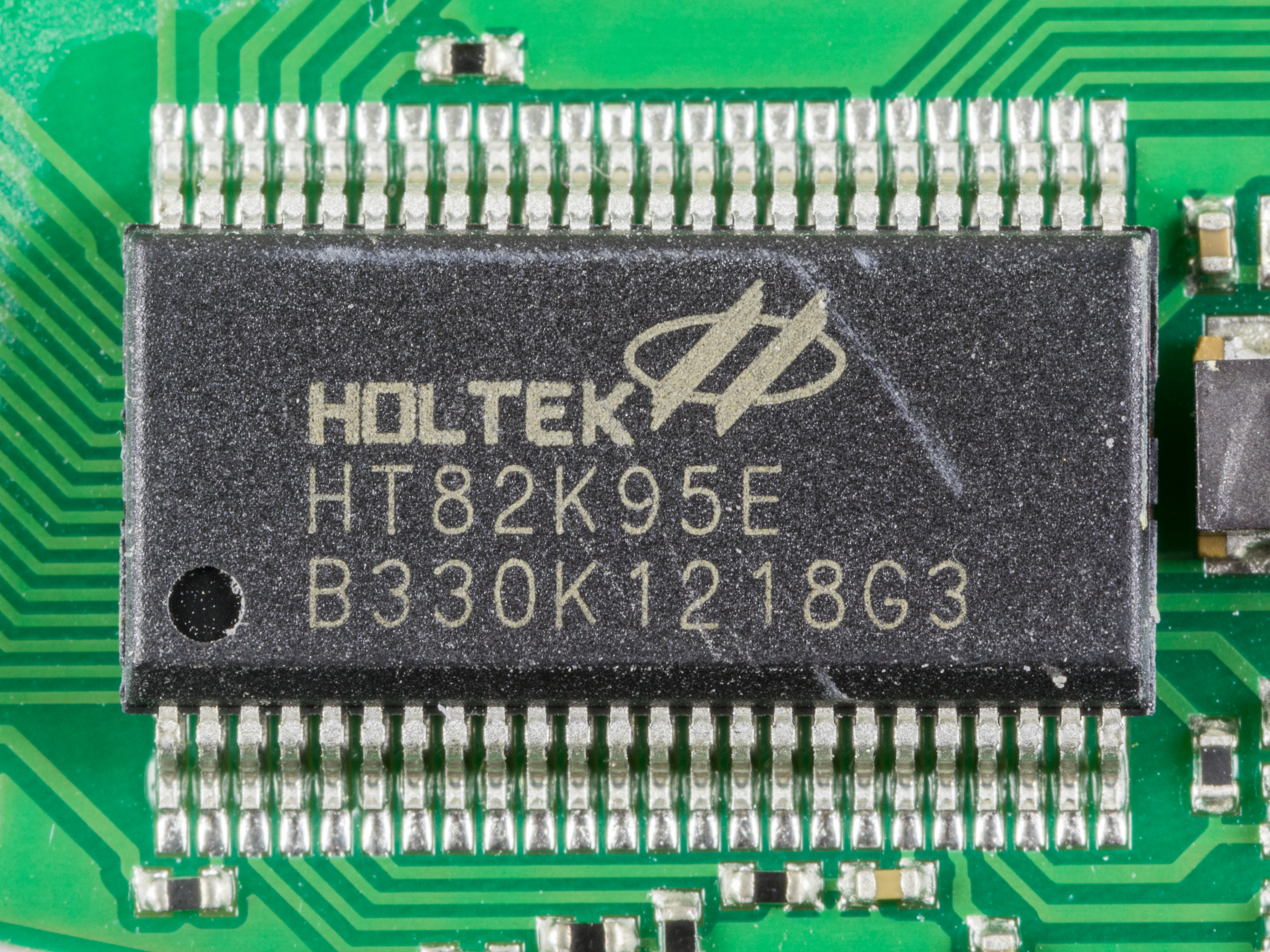
Holtek HT82K95E microcontroller

Holtek's design focus is in the area of microcontroller development. Holtek's 32-bit series is based on ARM Cortex-M0+ and Cortex-M3 cores. They are also producing 8051 based controllers, but the majority of their 8-bit microcontrollers are based on a core designed in-house. All have common features such as timers, external interrupts, power-down functions, low-voltage reset, bi-directional I/O pins etc. The range of microcontrollers support clock speeds from 32 kHz up to 20 MHz. Device specific features include functions such as EEPROM memory, A/D converters, LCD interfaces, USB interfaces, operational amplifiers. Some of Holtek's 8-bit and 32-bit microcontroller devices:

- HT32F51XX ARM M3 core based 32-bit series
- HT66F3185/3195/1A5
- BS84XX Touch MCU series
- HT32F65XX BLDC Motor control LV / HV solutions
- HT66FXX Flash A/D type series
- HT68FXX Flash I/O type series
- HT95XX Telecom Peripheral series
- BS8XXX Touch IC series
- BMS MCU
- AC-DC / DC-DC
- 2.4GHZ RF
- DALI modules
- LDO and Detector
- Health care flash MCU (Glucose meter / Blood pressure)
- Touch modules / RF modules
- Music / Voice MCU
- PIR Flash MCU
- Wireless charger MCU
- CO/Smoke modules
- EV charger MCU
- GAS / Water meter MCU
- LCD drivers for EV / industrial

Holtek develops other devices, most of which could be classified as microcontroller peripheral devices. One area is that of Low Dropout Regulators where Holtek has provided a range of products with low supply currents. Holtek supports traditional products such as remote control and telecommunication devices. Some peripheral products include:

- HT7XX Power Management Devices
- HT93X/24X Memory Products
- HT12X Remote Control Devices
- HT16XX Display Drivers
- HT9XX Telecom Peripherals

Holtek Semiconductor devices are used in home appliances, computer peripheral equipment, home medical equipment market. The company also provides a design service for customers with specific microcontroller needs. These special microcontroller devices may integrate functions such as smart card interface or medical analog circuitry within the microcontroller.

== Development tools ==
Hardware Emulator with Integrated Programmer

Holtek also supplies its IDE-3000 development system to support its microcontroller devices. This is a suite of hardware and software development tools which includes real time hardware emulation and software simulation as well as tools for device programming of OTP and flash type devices. Some of Holtek's ICE In-Circuit Emulators also include an integrated device programmer eliminating the need for separate programming tools. The separate programming tools can be operated in a stand-alone mode without a PC connection.

== See also ==
- List of companies of Taiwan
- Instruction listings for Holtek 8-bit processors with 14 or 16 bit instructions
