= Liquid vapor display =

Type of display system

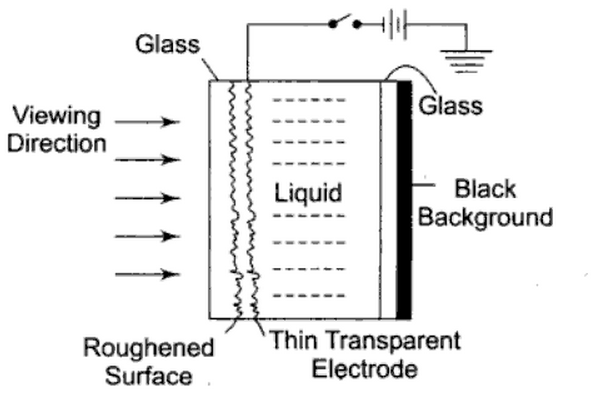
Liquid Vapor Display

Liquid Vapor Display (LVD) is a type of display system and is especially considered in economical display technologies. These employ a reflective passive display principle and depend on the presence of ambient lights for their operation. The figure shows the structure of a typical LVD cell. The principles of the LVD were first described in 1973.

It consists of a transparent volatile liquid encased between two glass plates and side spacers. The rear glass plate has a black background and the front glass surface in contact with the liquid is roughened, so that the liquid wets it; essentially, in its simplest form, an LVD consists of a roughened glass surface wet with a transparent volatile liquid of the same refractive index as that of the glass. The rear surface is blackened. The transparent electrode is heated by using a voltage drive, which is the basis of display function.

In the OFF condition of display with no voltage applied across the transparent electrode, the viewer sees the black background through the front transparent glass electrode and the liquid. To achieve the ON condition of the display, a voltage is applied to the transparent electrode. This causes sufficient heat in electrode, which evaporates the liquid in contact with it, and a combination of vapor film and vapor bubbles is formed around the roughened glass surface. As the refractive index of vapor is approximately 1, there is a discontinuity established at the interface between the front glass plate and the liquid, this causes the incoming light to scatter before reaching the black background, thus making it a simple display device.

The organic liquid selected for LVD should have the following features:

1. Refractive index close to that of the glass plate.

2. Minimum energy for vaporizing the liquid in contact with the roughened surface.

The electrical heating of a thin film of liquid adjacent to the roughened surface using transparent electrodes and the applied voltage, makes it an unusually good display with a better contrast ratio than an LCD. The speed of operation of LVD is low.
