= Intel BCD opcodes =

Set of x86 processor instructions

The Intel BCD opcodes are a set of six x86 instructions that operate with binary-coded decimal numbers: AAA, DAA, AAS, DAS, AAM, and AAD. Most arithmetic operations on x86 processors use a binary numeral system, but these instructions allow basic arithmetic using a decimal numeral system.

In addition, the x87 part supports a unique 18-digit (ten-byte) BCD format that can be loaded into and stored from the floating point registers, from where ordinary FP computations can be performed.

The integer BCD instructions are no longer supported in long mode.

== Usage ==
=== Number representation ===
BCD numbers can be represented in two ways in integer registers: packed decimal and unpacked decimal. Packed BCD numbers are generally stored in AL; operations on unpacked BCD numbers expect the least significant digit in AL, and the most significant digit, if present, in AH.

- Packed
  - BCD representation of two decimal digits is stored in one byte.
  - The values 10 to 15 in each 4-bit half are not used.
- Unpacked
  - In unpacked decimal representation a decimal digit is stored in one byte.
  - The values 10 to 255 are not used.
  - The upper nibble is ignored, and can either be zero, or the leading-nibble for the ASCII character (value 3).
  - After multiplication and AAM has been performed, the least significant digit is in AL and the most significant digit is in AH.
  - Before division, the least significant digit is in AL and the most significant digit is in AH. Then a AAD and a division is performed. The result is returned in AH and AL.

=== Adding ===
Only the decimal numbers 0 to 99 can be added directly.

First the numbers are added as usual using add (or adc if you need the carry flag). The processor will set the adjust flag if the sum of both lower nibbles is 16 or higher, and the carry flag if the sum of both bytes is 256 or higher.

Then the result is adjusted, depending on the number representation.

- Packed
  - The result is adjusted using daa (decimal adjust after addition): If the least significant nibble of the result is 10 or higher, or if the adjust flag is set, then the processor adds 6 to the result and discards any overflow of the nibble.
  - Then, if the most significant nibble of the result is 10 or higher, or if the carry flag is set, then the processor adds 96 (6 times 16) to the result and sets the carry flag.
- Unpacked
  - The result is adjusted using aaa (ASCII adjust after addition): If the least significant nibble of the result is 10 or higher, then the processor adds 6 to it and discards any overflow of the nibble, and stores it in the least significant byte.
  - The most significant byte is incremented.
  - Note that at this point the most significant byte may not contain a valid decimal number.

=== Subtraction ===
Only the decimal numbers 0 to 99 can be subtracted directly. First the numbers are subtracted as usual using sub (or sbb if you need the carry flag). The processor will set the adjust flag if a borrow occurred in the least significant nibble, and the carry flag if a borrow occurred in the most significant nibble.

- Packed
  - The result is adjusted using das (decimal adjust after subtraction): If the least significant nibble of the result is 10 or higher, or if the adjust flag is set, then the processor subtracts 6 from the result.
  - Then, if the most significant nibble of the result is 10 or higher, or if the carry flag is set, then the processor subtracts 96 (6 times 16) from the result and sets the carry flag.
- Unpacked
  - The result is adjusted using aas (ASCII adjust after subtraction): If the least significant nibble of the result is 10 or higher, then the processor subtracts 6 from it and stores it in the least significant byte.
  - The most significant byte is decremented.
  - Note that at this point the most significant byte may not contain a valid decimal number.

=== Multiplication ===
Only unpacked representation is supported. Only two single digit numbers can be multiplied.

First the digits are multiplied as usual using mul.

Then the result is adjusted using aam (ASCII adjust for multiplication): The processor divides the result by ten, storing the quotient (just the integral part) in the most significant byte of the result and the remainder in the least significant byte of the result.

=== Division ===
Only unpacked representation is supported. Operands must fall in the range 0 to 99.

First the operands are converted to normal binary representation using aad (ASCII adjust before division): The processor converts numbers by multiplying the most significant byte by 10 and adding the least significant byte. The quotient and remainder of the division are obtained as usual using div, and will be present in normal binary representation.

=== In x87 ===
The x87 coprocessor has BCD support in the form of a pair of load (FBLD) and store-and-pop (FBSTP) instructions. The former loads an 80-bit BCD integer into the FPU, while the latter writes a FPU value as an 80-bit integer value into the memory. Inside of the FPU, the values are stored as normal x87 extended-precision floats. Unlike the integer-facing versions, the two instructions remain available in long mode.

The 80-bit format is divided into the following:

79	78 .. 72	71 .. 0
Sign	Unused (0)	18 packed digits

There is a special "indefinite" value encoded as FFFFC000000000000000h.

== Application ==
Binary-coded decimal (BCD) numbers are used for storing decimal numbers, especially in financial software.

The opcodes mentioned above provided rudimentary BCD support for x86; however, it was removed long mode in x86-64, as it was not heavily used by compilers.

== Alternatives ==
Adding BCD numbers using these opcodes is a complex task, and requires many instructions to add even modest numbers. Using unpacked BCD numbers is memory-inefficient. If only doing integer calculations, then all integer calculations are exact, so the radix of the number representation is not important for accuracy. On an x86 processor, calculations with binary numbers are usually a lot faster than the same calculations with BCD numbers.

== See also ==
- x86 Bit manipulation instruction set
