= Low-voltage detect =

Electronic circuit to reset on low voltage

A low-voltage detect (LVD) is a microcontroller or microprocessor peripheral that generates a reset signal when the Vcc supply voltage falls below Vref. Sometimes is combined with power-on reset (POR) and then it is called POR-LVD.

== See also ==
- Power-on reset
