= Boe-Bot =

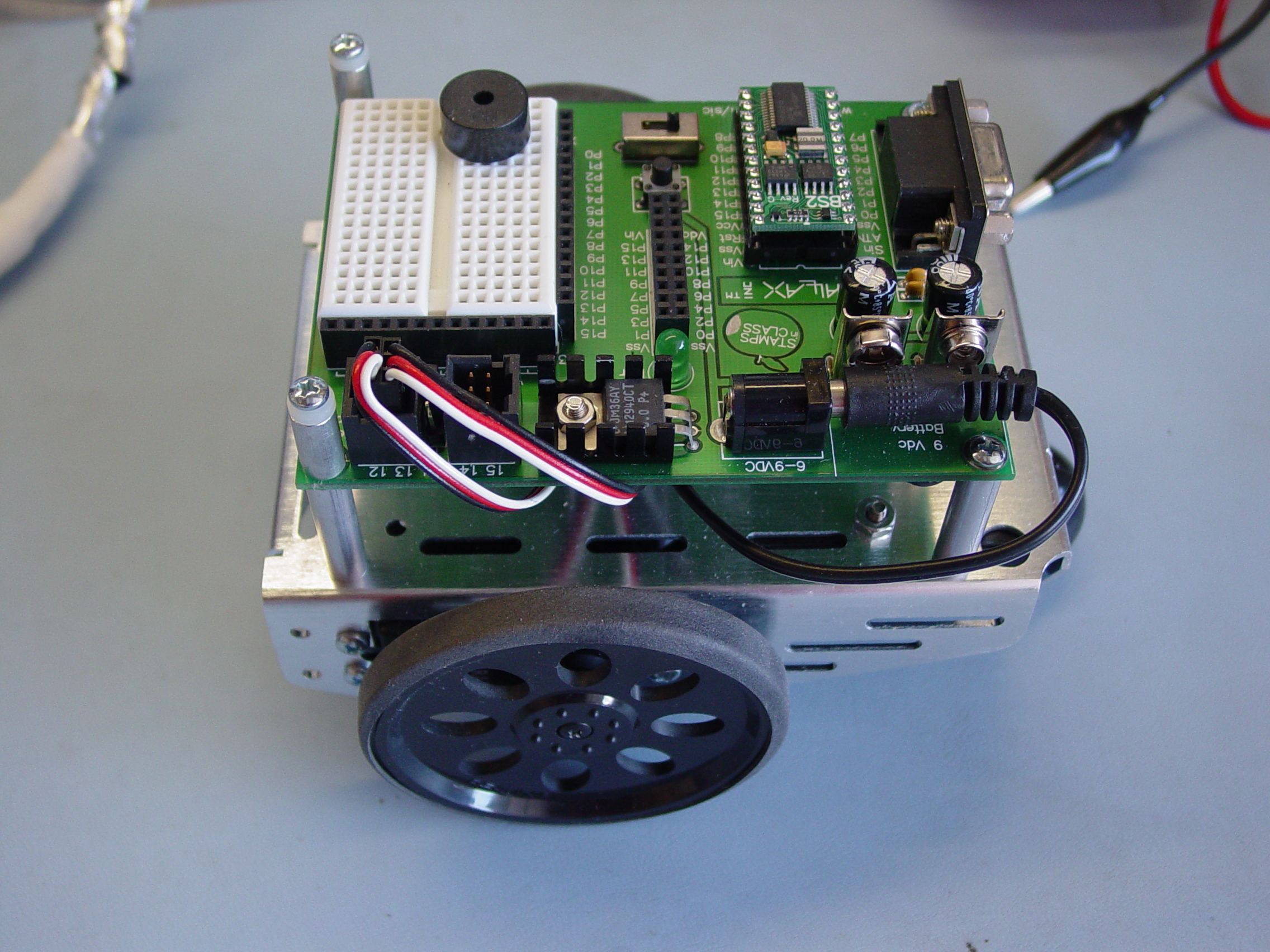
A traditional Boe-Bot

BOE–Bot is short for Board of Education robot. It is the trade name of a robot kit that is used in junior high, high school and college robotics classes. It consists of a main circuit board (the Board of Education) and breadboard, a plug–in BASIC Stamp microcontroller, two servo motors to drive the wheels, and an aluminum chassis that the parts bolt onto. Students can use Erector set parts, Lego blocks, and additional servos to build custom projects. The BOE-bot has been manufactured and sold by Parallax Inc since 1998.

== Main components ==
The green detachable main circuit, mounted on the top of the robot is called the Board of Education. The microcontroller which plugs into a socket on the green circuit board is called the BASIC Stamp . The BASIC Stamp is programmed in PBASIC. The rear wheel is a drilled polyethylene ball held in place with a cotter pin. Wheels are machined to fit on the servo spline and held in place with a screw. The BASIC Stamp is easy to program. The Boe–Bot is small, approximately four inches wide, and runs on four AA batteries. There is no soldering required for construction.

== Features ==
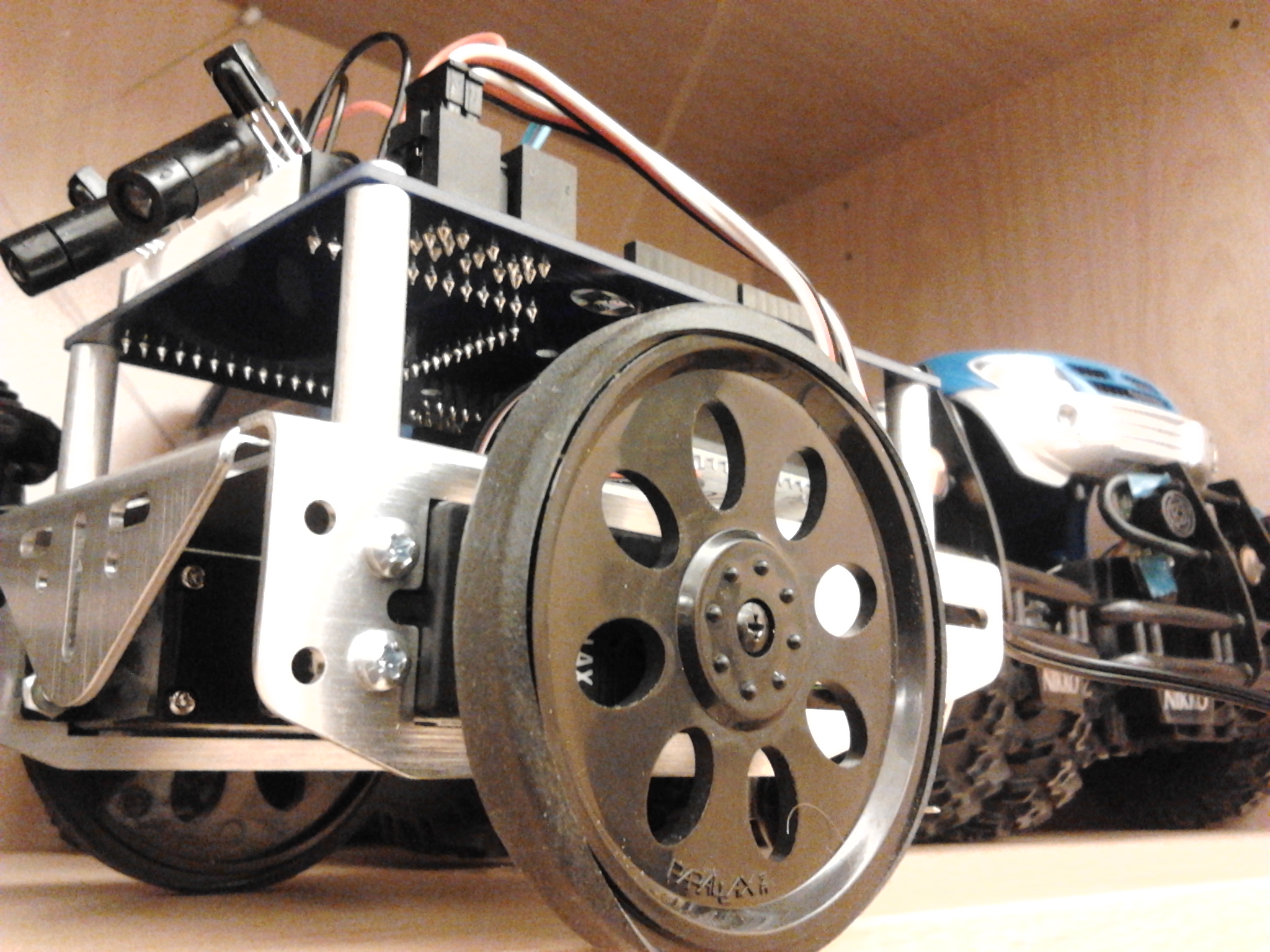
An Arduino based Boe-Bot

The Boe–Bot is a robot that can be used in a variety of ways including combining Microsoft Robotics Developer Studio software with the Boe–Bot to control the robot's movements. The BOE–Bot is programmed using the PBASIC language.
