= Institute for Personal Robots in Education =

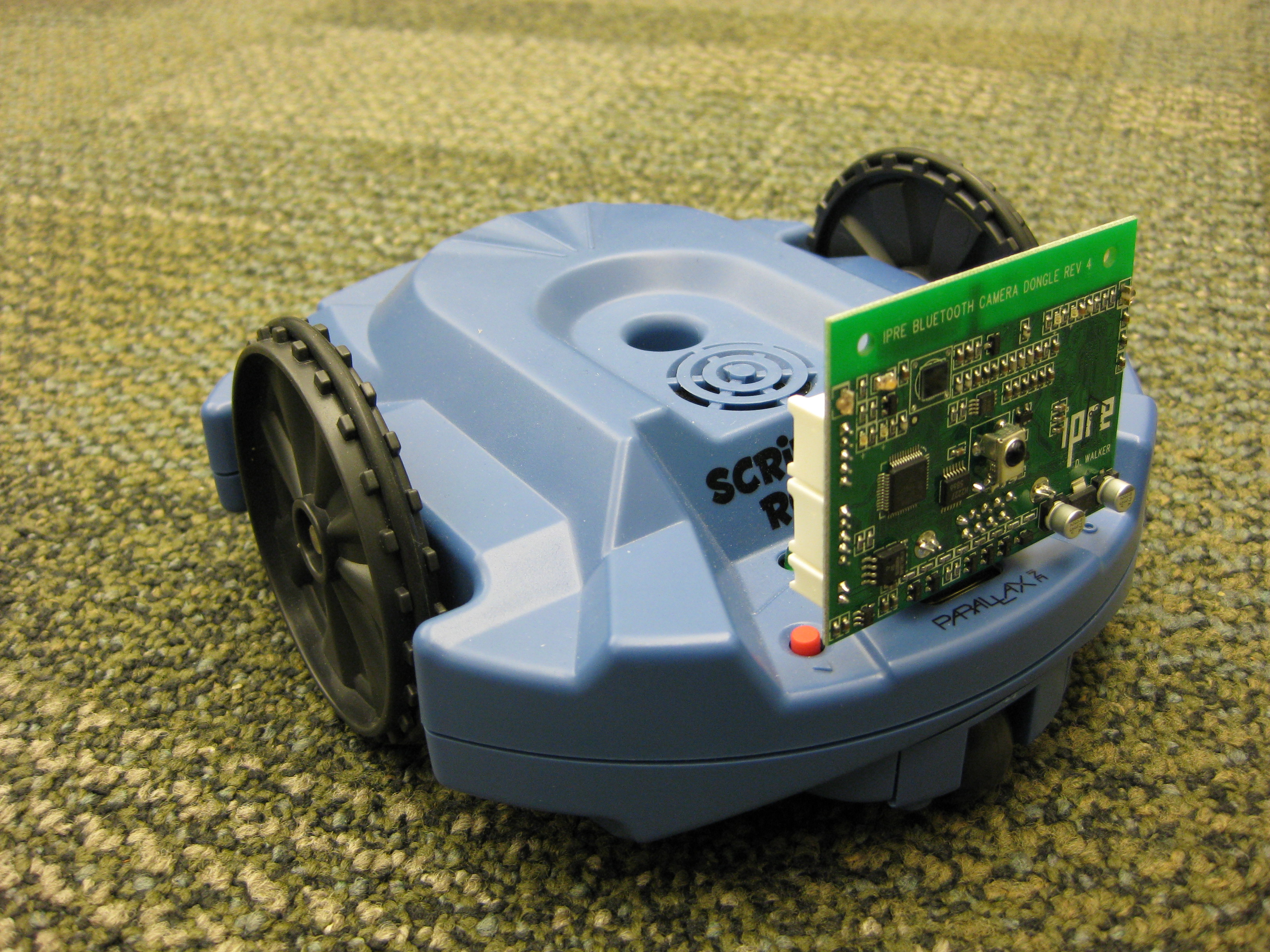
The Scribbler robot used by IPRE in teaching introductory computer science courses

Institute for Personal Robots in Education (IPRE) was initiated by a $1 million grant from Microsoft Research to Bryn Mawr College and the Georgia Institute of Technology and announced in July 2006. IPRE is designing introductory computer science curricula centered on a Personal Robot. Their vision is that each student will purchase a small, inexpensive robot at the bookstore which they will use throughout their classes in exploring computer science. The hope is that the robot will cost about as much as a textbook. IPRE will develop the hardware, software, and curricular materials for these courses.

The software being developed for introductory computer science courses is called Myro, short for My Robot, and is based in part on Pyro from Python Robotics. Myro is an interface to communicate with robots. It is designed to be used through a number of computer languages, include Python, Ruby, and Scheme.

The robot currently being used is the Scribbler from Parallax, Inc. (company) augmented with a small computer board, called the Fluke. The Fluke contains Bluetooth and a camera. This allows any robot that has a serial interface to be controlled through the low-cost Fluke.

== History ==
- Announced in July 2006
- First courses taught at Bryn Mawr College and Georgia Institute of Technology in Spring 2007

== See also ==
- Python Robotics
