= Scribbler (robot) =

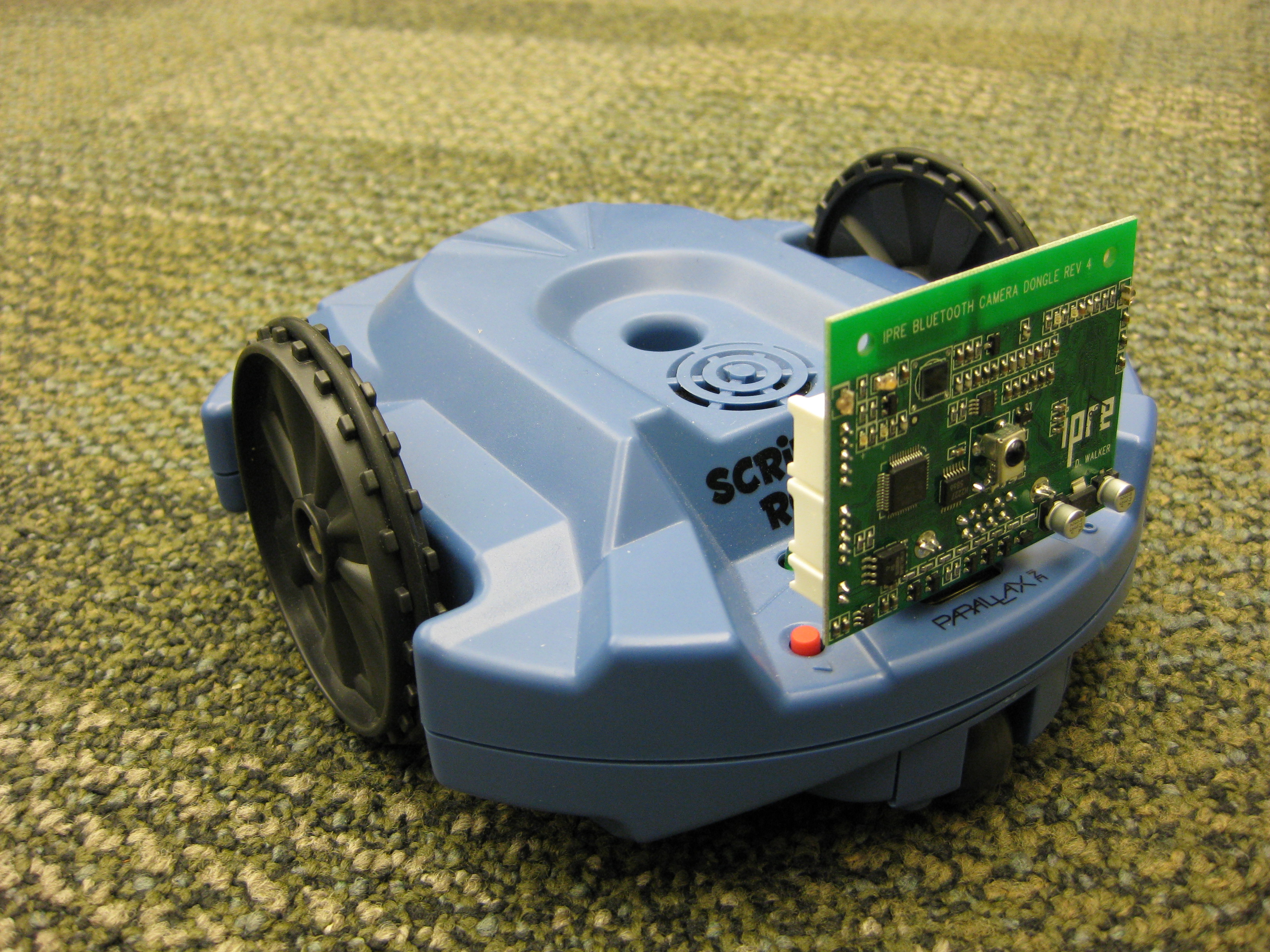
- The Scribbler robot used by IPRE in teaching introductory computer science courses
- Manufacturer: Parallax Inc., Element Products Inc., Bueno Systems Inc.
- Type: robot
- Released: May 2010

The Scribbler is a small, low-cost fully programmable intelligent robot with multiple sensor systems. It is capable of auto navigation and interaction with its environment.

The Scribbler is a combined effort of three companies: Parallax Inc., Element Products Inc., and Bueno Systems Inc. In May 2010, the Scribbler was selling for a retail price of around US$100.

A newer version of the Scribbler, Scribbler 2, came out in the fourth quarter of 2010, and Scribbler 3 is also now available.

The Scribbler has a built in BASIC Stamp 2 microcontroller brain. For inputting sensory information, the Scribbler has three photoresistor light sensors, infrared emitter, and infrared detector. Additional add-ons can be bought to give the robot more capabilities through the serial port. For example, a bluetooth emitter/receiver or a wireless card can be bought to interface with the robot.

The Scribbler can be programmed through any BASIC Stamp Editor program, or through a GUI-style interface, provided on Parallax's website. This uses different "command tiles" to control the motors and sensors. Using a Myro library, you can also program the Scribbler in Python.

The Scribbler is used by many teachers for educational purposes. For example, Institute for Personal Robots in Education (IPRE) has developed extensive educational materials using the Scribbler.
