= Python Robotics =

(Pyro) - Python Robotics
- Initial release: March 10, 2003
- Stable release: 5.0 / August 15, 2007; 18 years ago
- Available in: Python, C++
- Website: pyrorobotics.com

Python Robotics (Pyro) is a project designed to create an easy-to-use interface for accessing and controlling a wide variety of real and simulated robots.

== History ==
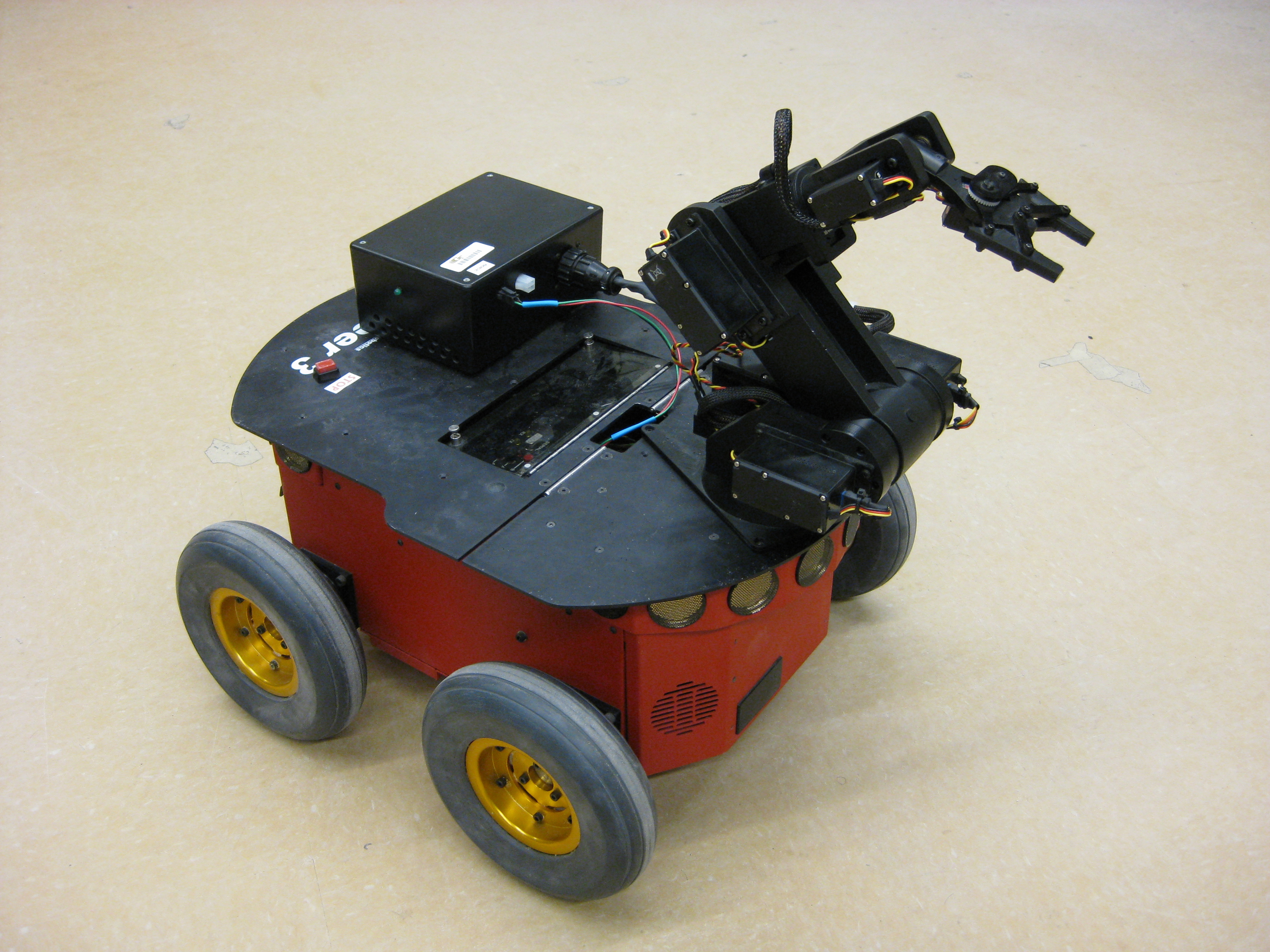
The Pioneer robot is one of many which PyroBot can simulate.

Pyrobot was funded from 2003 to 2005 by the National Science Foundation as NSF DUE CCLI-EMD Award number 0231363, "Beyond LEGOs: Hardware, Software, and Curriculum for the Next Generation Robot Laboratory". The principal investigators on the NSF grant were Douglas Blank of Bryn Mawr College, Kurt Konolige of SRI International, Deepak Kumar (computer scientist) of Bryn Mawr College, Lisa Meeden of Swarthmore College, and Holly Yanco of University of Massachusetts Lowell.

PyroBot is a Python library with some C++ code for processing camera images. It has connections to Player, Stage, and Gazebo. It also contains its own simulator written completely in Python. It can directly control a variety of real robots, including the Pioneer, Khepera, AIBO, and Hemisson.

The ideas from PyroBot continue to evolve as Myro, short for My Robot, in the Institute for Personal Robots in Education software, although it is no longer for Python only. Myro can be used by many other computer languages as well.

== See also ==
- List of robotics software
- Robotics
- Open-source robotics
