= André LaMothe =

American computer scientist

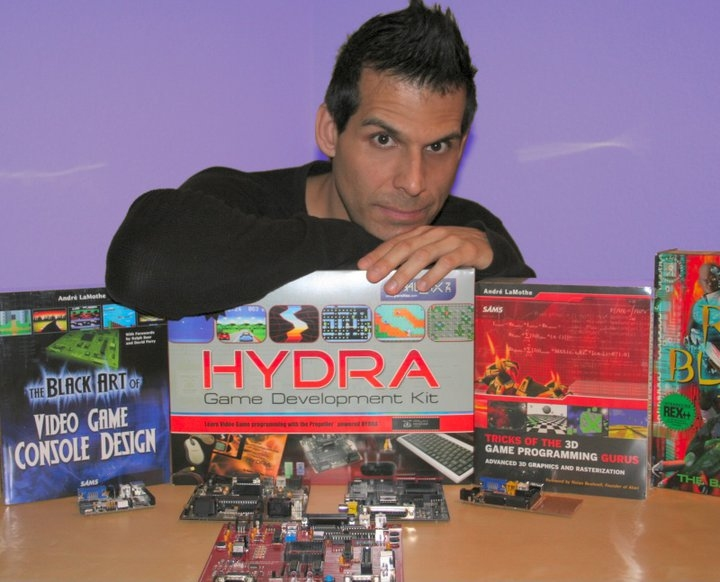
- Occupations: Hardware engineer Game developer Author

André LaMothe is a computer scientist, author, hardware engineer, and game programmer, known for writing books about game development.

== Game design and programming ==
LaMothe is an independent game designer who was CEO of Xtreme Games and also developed video games for Microsoft Windows. In the gaming industry LaMothe has a reputation as the "Yoda of game design," encouraging and teaching other programmers. He and Alex Varanese also designed the XGameStation Micro Edition as a game development tool for hobbyists and students.

LaMothe is also the hardware evangelist for the upcoming Intellivision Amico and the founder of Nurve Networks LLC and iC0nstrux.com.

== Writing career ==
LaMothe is an author of multiple books on computer programming and game design, including Windows Game Programming for Dummies. Other books include Tricks of the 3D Game Programming Gurus, which tackles the development of a 3D software engine across 1600 pages.

Many of his game development books were released in the 1990s and early 2000s. He has been described as having "an uncanny knack of shaping some of the most difficult and mind-bending programming concepts into a palatable form."

== Selected bibliography ==
- LaMothe, André, ed. (1994). Tricks of the game-programming gurus. Indianapolis, Indiana: Sams Publ. ISBN 978-0-672-30507-8.
- LaMothe, André (1999). Tricks of the Windows Game Programming Gurus: Fundamentals of 2D and 3D Game Programming. Indianapolis, Indiana: Sams. ISBN 978-0-672-31361-5.
- LaMothe, André (1995). Black art of 3D game programming. Corte Madera, Calif: Waite Group Press. ISBN 978-1-57169-004-3.
- LaMothe, André (1996). Teach yourself game programming in 21 days. Indianapolis, Ind: SAMS. ISBN 978-0-672-30562-7.
- LaMothe, André (2002). Windows game programming for dummies. New York: Wiley. ISBN 978-0-7645-1678-8.
- LaMothe, André (2004). Tricks of the 3D game programming gurus: advanced 3D graphics and rasterization. Indianapolis, Ind: Sams. ISBN 978-0-672-31835-1.
- LaMothe, André (2005-12-22). The Black Art of Video Game Console Design. SAMS. ISBN 978-0672328206.
- Game Programming for the Propeller Powered HYDRA
- Game Programming Starter Kit

== See also ==
- XGameStation series
- HYDRA Game Development Kit
