= BASIC Atom =

Basic Atom refers to a line of self-contained microcontrollers from Basic Micro.

Like the Basic stamp, the Basic Atom line is based upon various microchips pre-programmed with an interpreter, making it easy to change "programs", as they are only "data" being interpreted. Basic Atom refers to a line of self-contained microcontrollers from Basic Micro. A compiler converts a high level language into the interpretive "code" which is then loaded in as data, and run.

- The product line consists of:
  - Basic Atom - Basic Stamp 2 compatible devices, claiming faster execution
  - Basic Atom Nano, a series of pre-programmed chips for those that want to integrate the functionality into other products without adding other boards
  - Basic Atom Pro, a line of higher capacity devices.
  - Board-level products, such as for robotic control, etc.
  - Accessories such as power supplies.

Basic Atom chips may be added to other projects via the familiar Dual in-line package style, or the higher density TQFP.

One small Basic Atom Pro is implemented as a Single in-line package thus taking very little area on a board, at the expense of greater height.
