= Personal robot =

Robot designed to be useful for individuals

Pictogram showing a personal robot (PR)

A personal robot is one whose human interface and design make it useful for individuals. This is by contrast to industrial robots which are generally configured and operated by robotics specialists. A personal robot is one that enables an individual to automate the repetitive or menial part of home or work life making them more productive.

Similar to the way that the transition from mainframe computers to the personal computers revolutionized personal productivity, the transition from industrial robotics to personal robotics is changing productivity in home and work settings.

Turning a robot like ASIMO or Atlas into a universally applicable personal robot or artificial servant is mainly a programming task. Vast improvements in motion planning, computer vision (esp. scene recognition), natural language processing, and automated reasoning are indispensable to make this a possibility.

== History ==
- iRobot Corp. introduced the Roomba in 2002
- The Institute for Personal Robots in Education introduced the concept to teach computing using personal robots in 2006.
- Stanford University Personal Robotics Program introduced PR1 in 2007.
- Willow Garage introduced the PR2 robot in 2010.
- RoboDynamics introduced Luna in 2011.
- Milagrow HumanTech introduced India's 1st Robotic vacuum cleaner, the RedHawk in 2011 and then the World's 1st Body Massaging Robot in 2012.

== Toys ==
Robotic toys, such as the well known Furby, have been popular since 1998. There are also small humanoid remote controlled robots. Electronic pets, such as robotic dogs, can be good companions. They have also been used by many universities in competitions such as the RoboCup.

There are many different kinds of toy robots that have been invented since the late 1900s. There were many robotic toys invented that were used for entertainment. One popular example was called the Furby, a toy that children nourished every day. The toy robot made it seem like it was alive, like a pet that you have to watch and give attention to. There are many different kinds of toy robots that are animal related, such as robotic dogs. Another type of robotic toy is the phone-powered robot. Using this toy, you are able to connect with your phone and control the toy while using an application. Now, robotic toys are becoming more integrated with mobile device platforms. This in turn is creating a larger demand for these types of products. The increase in demand has a direct effect on the advancement of the technology used in the toys.

== Social robots ==
Social robots take on the function of social communication. Domestic humanoid robots are used by elderly and immobilized residents to keep them company. Wakamaru is a domestic humanoid robot developed in Japan. Its function is to act as a care taker. Wakamaru has a number of operations and “can be programmed to remind patients to take their medicine and even call a doctor when it appears that someone is in distress.” Paro, a robotic baby seal, is intended to provide comfort to nursing home patients.

Home-telepresence robots can move around in a remote location and let one communicate with people there via its camera, speaker, and microphone. Through other remote-controlled telepresence robots, the user can visit a distant location and explore it as if they were physically present. These robots can, among other applications, permit health-care workers to monitor patients or allow children who are homebound because of injuries, illnesses, or other physical challenges to attend school remotely. Kuri, JIBO and ConnectR are family robots that includes telepresence.

=== Entertainment services ===
Network robots link ubiquitous networks with robots, contributing to the creation of new lifestyles and solutions to address a variety of social problems including the aging of population and nursing care.

=== Therapy ===
Robots built for therapy have been in production for quite some time now. Some of these uses can be for autism or physical therapy. As for robots designed to help autism, authors Daniel J. Ricks and Mark B. Colton suggest that these robots will elicit and bring out specific behaviors of children, ones not previously seen before the use of these robots. This shows the goals set for robots in therapy for children with autism is to help form social behaviors. A large number of children with autism have communication issues, these robots can assist them and help them learn. They can also be used to assist adults with physical issues involving muscles or limbs.

== See also ==
- Companion robot
- DARPA Robotics Challenge
- Domestic robot
- Microsoft Robotics Developer Studio
- Open-source hardware
- Outline of robotics § Robots
- Robot Operating System
- Soft robotics
- URBI
