= Ubicom =

- Company type: Subsidiary
- Founded: May 1998
- Headquarters: San Jose, California, USA
- Key people: Teresa H. Meng, founder and director Craig H. Barratt, President
- Products: Ethernet WLAN Bluetooth GPS Powerline communications Hybrid Wired/Wireless Location
- Parent: Qualcomm Atheros
- Website: www.qca.qualcomm.com

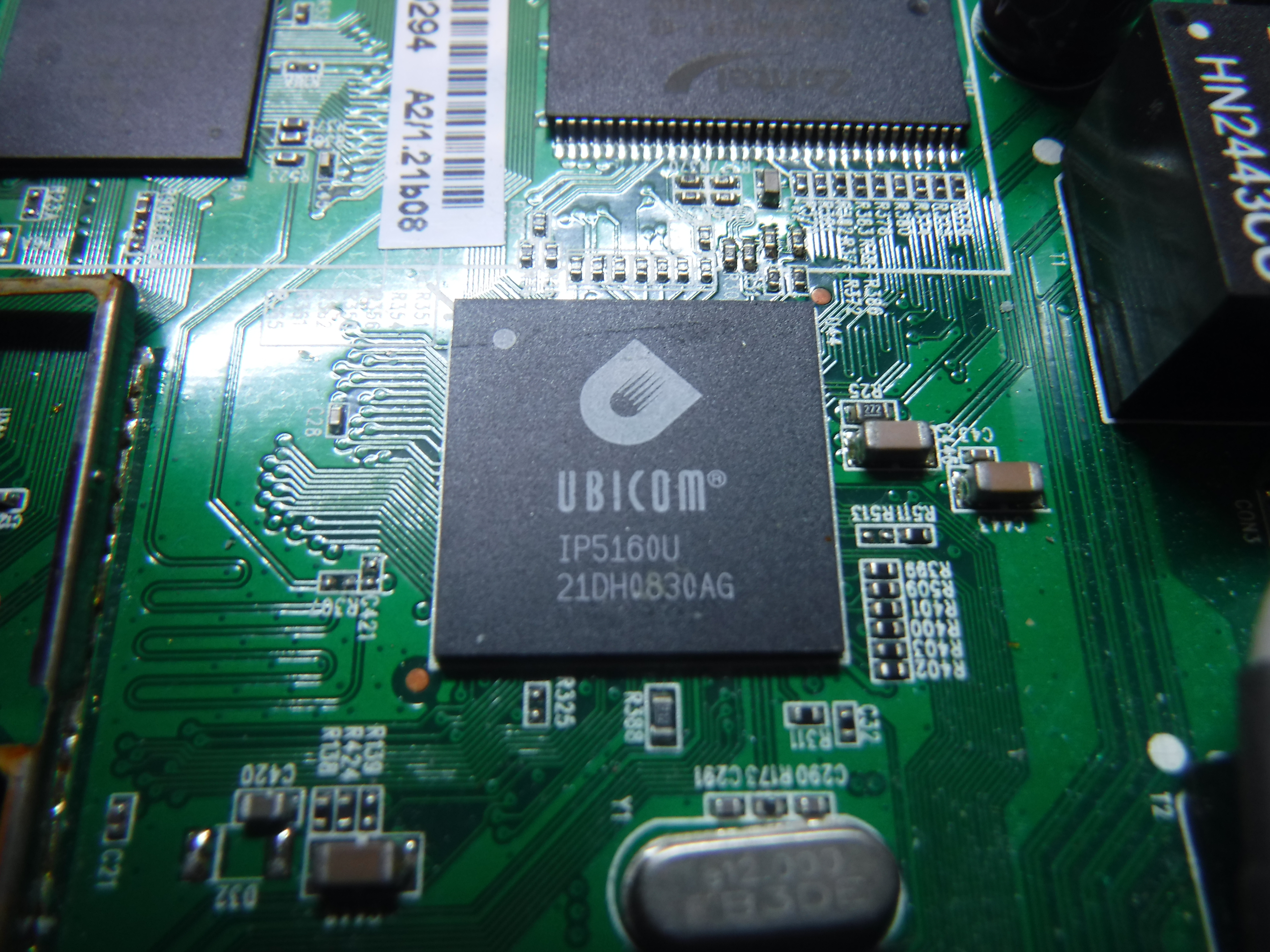
Ubicom IP5160U Network Processor

Ubicom was a company which developed communications and media processor (CMP) and software platforms for real-time interactive applications and multimedia content delivery in the digital home. The company provided optimized system-level solutions to OEMs for a wide range of products including wireless routers, access points, VoIP gateways, streaming media devices, print servers and other network devices. Ubicom was a venture-backed, privately held company with corporate headquarters in San Jose, California.

== History ==
Ubicom was founded as Scenix Semiconductor in 1996. The company operated under that name until 1999. In 2000, Scenix became "Ubicom," a word derived from "ubiquitous communications".

- April 1999: Mayfield Fund leads $10 million equity investment in Scenix.
- November 2000: Scenix changes its name to Ubicom.
- November 2002: Intersil and Ubicom demonstrate world's first 802.11g wireless access point.
- March 2006: Ubicom secures $20 million in Series 3 funding, led by Investcorp Technology Ventures.
- March 2012: Ubicom is taken over by Qualcomm Atheros.

== Products ==
As Scenix and Ubicom, the company designed several families of microcontrollers, including:

- The SX Series of 8-bit microcontrollers, a product line which was partially compatible with Microchip PIC microcontrollers and ran at up to 100 MHz, single cycle. This product was eventually sold to Parallax, who continued its production.
- The IP series of high performance media and Internet processors. These devices were designed to act as gateways for streaming media and data over wired and wireless links.

The Scenix/Ubicom processors relied on very high speed and low latency processing to emulate hardware interfaces in software such as interrupt-polled soft-UARTS. This reduced the size of the silicon chip and therefore the cost, but increased the complexity of the software required on the chip.

Ubicom developed its own architecture, the Ubicom32, and a real-time operating system (RTOS) for it. For example, the D-Link HD Media Router 3000 DIR-857 contains the Ubicom IP8000AU and the Western Digital WD N900 the Ubicom IP8260U CPU. The firmware is most probably Linux-based, maybe even OpenWrt-based, rather than Ubicom RTOS-based.

Logging in via telnet on a Western Digital N900, the CPU and uClinux version is known as:

# cat /proc/version
uClinux version 2.6.36+ (bouble_hung@apollo) (gcc version 4.4.1 (GCC) ) #1 SMP Fri Apr 12 18:16:22 PHT 2013
# cat /proc/cpuinfo 
Vendor          : Ubicom
CPU             : IP8K
MMU             : enabled
FPU             : enabled
Arch            : 4
Rev             : 1
Clock Freq      : 600.0 MHz
DDR Freq        : 533.0 MHz
BogoMips        : 589.82
Calibration     : 294912000 loops
Hardware        : UbicomIP8K
cpu[00]         : thread id - 6
cpu[01]         : thread id - 2
cpu[02]         : thread id - 3
cpu[03]         : thread id - 4
cpu[04]         : thread id - 5
# cat /proc/interrupts 
           CPU0       CPU1       CPU2       CPU3       CPU4       Reentrant?
  2:     340937     361457     429308     449005     359141          0       UbicoIPI  ipi
 27:          0          0  399980568          0          0       8216       Ubicom32  ubi32_na
 33:   30709990          0          0          0          0      25334       Ubicom32  timer-primary
 34:          0   11470112          0          0          0       3743       Ubicom32  timer-cpu
 35:          0          0   23060922          0          0      14194       Ubicom32  timer-cpu
 36:          0          0          0   41134181          0      56087       Ubicom32  timer-cpu
 37:          0          0          0          0    8820184       2088       Ubicom32  timer-cpu
 44:          0          0          0          0          0          0       PCIE-MSI  aerdrv
 58:          0          0          0          0          0          0       Ubicom32  FAN SPEED
 60:          0          0          0          0          0          0       PCIE-MSI  aerdrv
 70:          1          0          0          0          0          0       Ubicom32  dwc_otg, dwc_otg_hcd:usb1
 71:          1          0          0          0          0          0       Ubicom32  dwc_otg, dwc_otg_hcd:usb2
 82:          0          0          0          0          0          0       Ubicom32  UBI32_SERDES
 83:      60986      58900      60267      63509      63382       5056       Ubicom32  UBI32_SERDES 2
 92:          0   33996835          0          0          0          0       Ubicom32  wifi1
 93:          0   33996835          0          0          0          0       Ubicom32  pciej
 94:          0          0          0   31041951          0          0       Ubicom32  wifi0
 95:          0          0          0   31041951          0          2       Ubicom32  pciek
