= IoBridge =

Manufacturer of Internet-based monitor and control hardware

ioBridge
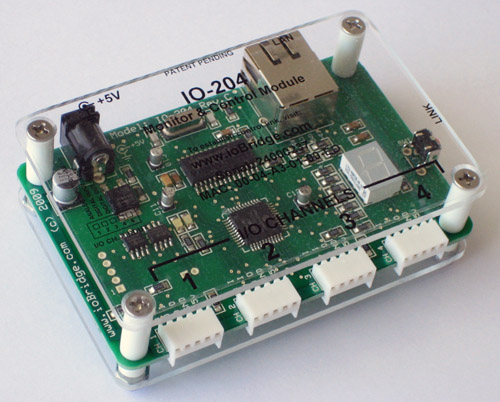
- ioBridge IO-204
- Manufacturer: ioBridge, Inc.
- Type: Monitor & Control Module
- Input: 4 I/O channels with separate digital input, analog input and digital output, up to 4 Smart Boards for more complex functions
- Connectivity: 10/100/1000BASE-T auto-negotiated network
- Power: 5 V

ioBridge is a manufacturer of Internet-based monitor and control hardware and a provider of cloud-based social Web 2.0 folksonomies and webservices using WebSockets and JSON.

Jason Winters and Hans Scharler founded ioBridge in Gainesville, Florida on June 26, 2008.

In December 2008, ioBridge released the IO-204 Monitor and Control Module and web services platform to connect electronics projects online such as an iPhone-controlled dog treat dispenser and a toaster that could post to Twitter.

In 2009, ReadWriteWeb chose the IO-204 Module as one of its "Top 10 Internet of Things Products of 2009", and Ben Arnold from the Consumer Electronics Association (CEA) explored the possibilities of using the IO-204 for social-network-aware home automation in the article "Growing the connected home ecosystem".

User projects using the ioBridge module and web services have been featured on popular technology blogs such as Engadget and Hackaday.

== IO-204 Module ==
The IO-204 Module connects to a local area network using 10/100/1000BASE-T Ethernet and then establishes an encrypted connection to ioBridge web servers.

The IO-204 has four GPIO channels. Each channel includes a 5 V power line, a ground connection, digital input pin, analog input pin, and a digital output pin. The digital input line is capable of reading voltages of 0 V and 5 V and pulse counting. The analog input is 10-bit resolution for voltages varying between 0 V and 5 V. The digital output line outputs 0 V and 5 V at 20 mA and is capable of sending pulses and serial data.

Each channel supports smart boards to add serial communication for microcontrollers such as Arduino or BASIC Stamp, servo control, or X10 outlet and light control.

The module provides 1 KB of on-board logic storage for rules defined by the user. A rule is a set of conditions and actions based on time, input conditions, output conditions, and online/offline status.

The IO-204 requires a regulated 5 V power adapter with a minimum of 1 A and a maximum of 4 A.

== Web services ==
ioBridge modules are accessed via an ioBridge.com hosted web interface for configuration, control, and monitoring from a web browser supporting Ajax, JavaScript, CSS, and HTML. Features of the web service include a drag-and-drop dashboard, data logging, data charting, widget creation, and email alerting.

APIs allow the web services to be extended and integrated into third-party applications using a RESTful interface.
