= Netduino =

Open-source electronics prototyping platform

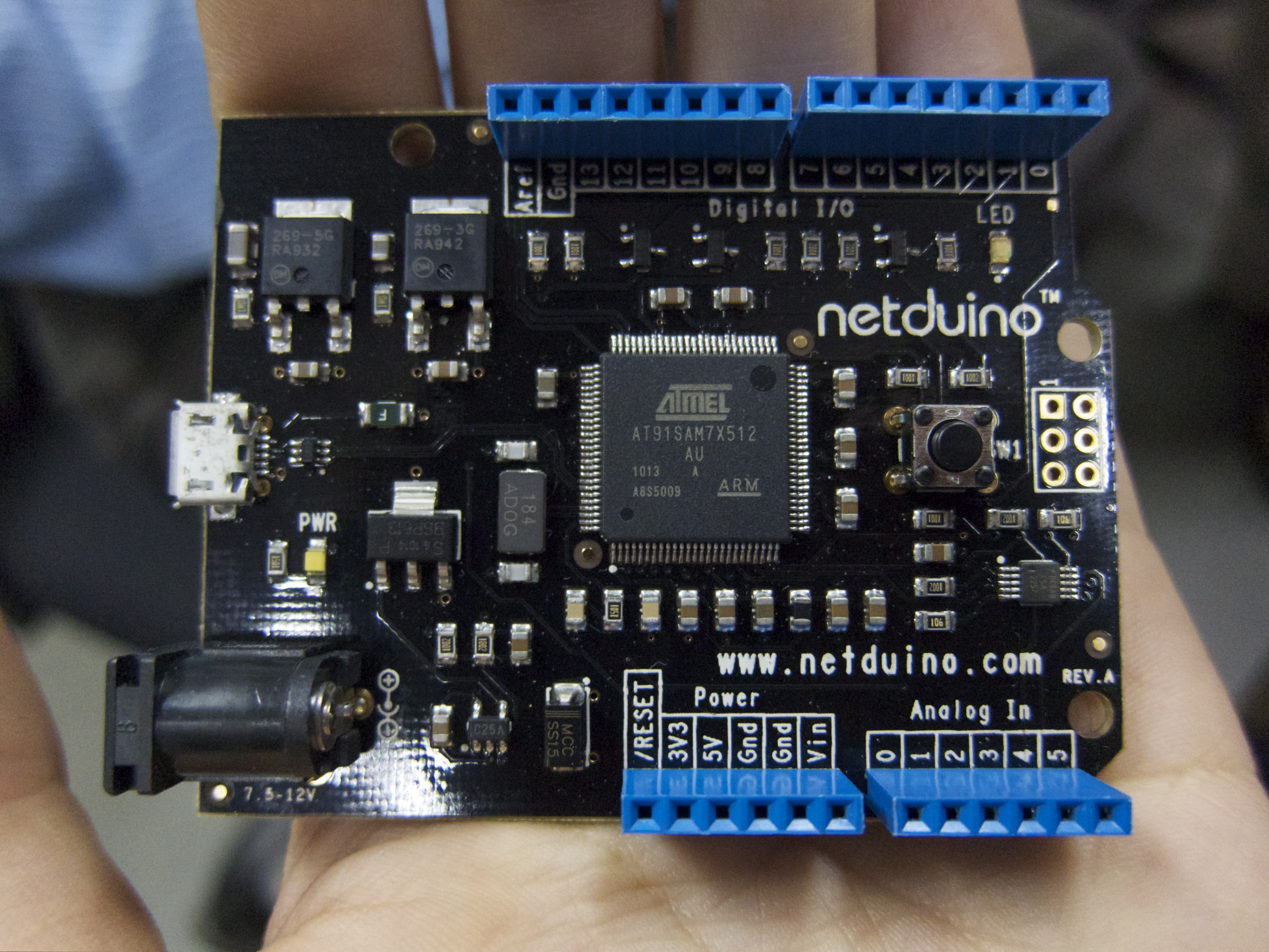

Netduino was an open-source electronics prototyping platform based on the .NET Micro Framework. It uses the ARM Cortex-M 32-bit RISC ARM processor core as a 32-bit ARM-microcontroller. The Netduino boards (except the discontinued Mini and Go models) are designed to be pin-compatible with most Arduino shields. Applications can be built on Windows (with Visual Studio), or on Mac OS (with Xamarin Studio). The platform is similar in concept to the Arduino platform, but is generally more powerful and instead of writing applications in C/C++ or Wiring (essentially, C++ without header files), applications are written in C#, which brings powerful, high-level language constructs to the toolbox such as threading, event handling, automatic garbage collection, and more.

== Development ==
Netduino was invented by Chris Walker, founder of Secret Labs.

The platform was actively supported by Wilderness Labs and had an active open source community. Some time in 2020 Wilderness Labs discontinued Netduino and completely superseded it by Meadow, an STM32F7-based microcontroller board with .NET Standard.

== Hardware ==
The Netduino family is based on the Cortex-M Micro Processor running the .NET Micro Framework (NETMF) v4.3. Development can be done on both Windows, with Visual Studio, or with Xamarin Studio on Mac OS X. IO includes 22 General Purpose Input/Output (GPIO) ports, 6 of which support hardware Pulse Width Modulation (PWM) generation, 4 UARTs (serial communication), I2C, and SPI (Serial Peripheral Interface Bus).

The Netduino family consists of the Netduino 3, Netduino 2, and the original Netduino 1 lines. The original Netduino (1st generation) and Netduino Mini (also 1st generation), have been replaced by the much more powerful Netduino 2 and 3 lines.

=== Netduino 3 ===
The Netduino 3 is based on a Cortex-M4 microcontroller running at 168 MHz with 384 KB of flash storage and 164 KB of RAM.

Netduino 3 is offered in 3 different models, the N3 base model, N3 Ethernet model, and the N3 WiFi model; which vary by their internet connectivity mode and their code/flash storage size. All N3 models support persistent storage with SD cards up to 2GB. Both the Ethernet and WiFi models have a Micro SD slot built in to the board. The base model can use SD cards via most Arduino SD Card add-on shields.

The N3 technical specifications are as follows:

Model	MCU	Flash	RAM	Network
N3	Cortex-M4 @ 168 MHz	384 KB	164+ KB	N/A
N3 Ethernet	Cortex-M4 @ 168 MHz	1408 KB	164+ KB	10/100 Mb/s Ethernet
N3 WiFi	Cortex-M4 @ 168 MHz	1408 KB	164+ KB	802.11b/g/n with SSL/TLS 1.2 Support

=== Netduino 2 ===
Netduino 2 is offered in 2 different models, the N2 base model as well as the N2+, which adds 10Mb Ethernet.

Model	MCU	Flash	RAM	Network
N2	Cortex-M3 @ 120 MHz	192 KB	60 KB	N/A
N2+	Cortex-M4 @ 168 MHz	384 KB	100+ KB	10 Mb/s Ethernet

=== Discontinued Models ===
The original Netduino forum is archived and contains historical and technical information about the original Netduino boards and development.

==== Netduino 1 ====
The original Netduino was based on an Atmel AT91SAM7X processor running at 48 MHz.

==== Netduino Plus ====
The Netduino Plus added an onboard Ethernet port and a microSD card reader.

==== Netduino Mini ====
The Netduino mini was a smaller breadboard mountable Netduino in a DIP package.

==== Netduino Go ====
With Netduino Go, all the peripherals were virtualized, with 8 gobus ports replacing the Arduino headers. Additional modules could be added through these ports, and each module had a small microchip which works together with the mainboard.
