= HYDRA Game Development Kit =

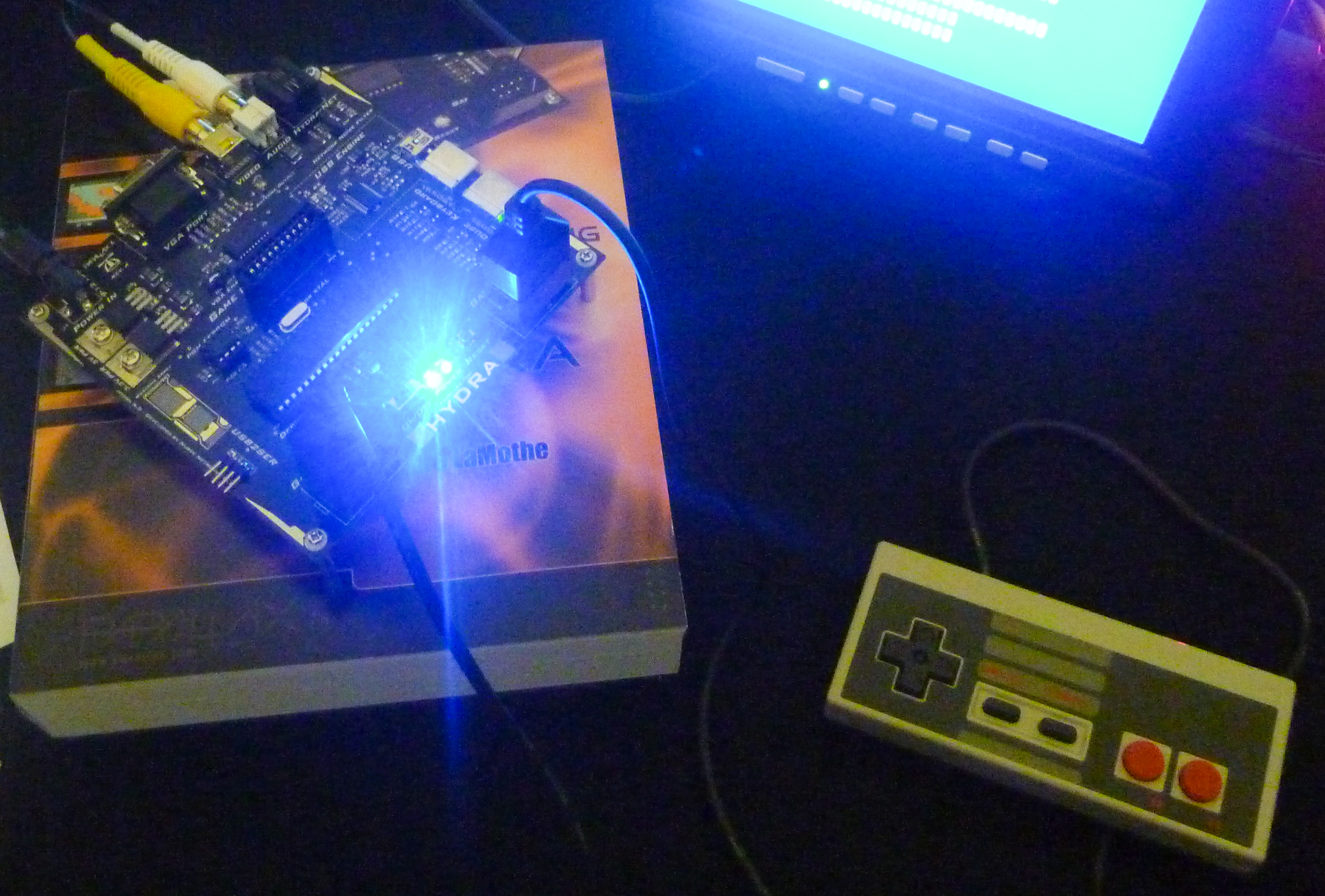
- A HYDRA Game Development Kit powered on
- Developer: André LaMothe
- Availability: Mid-Late 2000's
- Introductory price: $199 or $250
- CPU: 8-core 32-bit Parallax Propeller @ 80 MHz
- Predecessor: XGameStation series
- Language: Spin (programming language)

The HYDRA Game Development Kit launched in September 2006, and was developed by André LaMothe who designed the prior XGameStation series of consoles. Like the XGameStation, HYDRA is an open system, allowing anyone to create games for it. However, while still designed to teach electronics and programming, the system places greater focus on homebrew games. Compared to the prior XGameStation consoles, the HYDRA uses a more complex and powerful CPU - the then recently released Parallax Propeller processing unit, which has eight 32 bit RISC CPUs called cogs with 32 KB built in RAM and 32 KB built in ROM.

== Specifications ==
The HYDRA Game Development Kit has the following specifications:

It has a Propeller CPU at 160 MIPS, (80 MHz, 20 MIPS per cog) 8 PIC-like CPU cores each with 496 32bit-words of workspace plus a shared 32 KB RAM and 32 KB ROM and 128 KB serial EEPROM.

Its ports are: two NES Compatible Game Ports, one USB Programming port, one Serial Port or second USB port, two PS/2-compliant Ports for Mouse and Keyboard, one NTSC or PAL Video Output, or alternatively one VGA Video Output, one mono Audio output, one 20-Pin Expansion Interface connector, and one RJ-11 Peer-to-Peer Networking Port.

== Development ==
The Hydra comes with the large book (800+ pages) "Game programming for the propeller powered HYDRA", a CD with extensive software including demo games and a second book by LaMothe, a keyboard, a mouse, a NES keypad, USB and audio/video cables, a 128 KB "memory card", an experimenter card and a power supply.

The system can be programmed as the target of a PC-hosted IDE or through locally hosted programming languages. Tiny BASIC is included with the system, and the FORTH language is also available. The system can also be programmed in the Propeller's own built-in Spin programming language. Finally, the Hydra can also be programmed in assembler.

As the video display is generated in software, the capabilities of it depend on the software driver, but a typical PAL/NTSC driver would be able to generate a 256x192 screen resolution, and typically 86 to 96 colors maximum. The color resolution for the VGA display is hardwired to 64 colors maximum, and a typical resolution would be 800x600 depending on the available display memory. A video driver uses the main 32 KB RAM which it must share with code space. With the aid of the new 512 KB memory expander, video drivers can be written that extend the video generator's capabilities. To aid in the display of text the Propeller chip has a complete character font in its ROM.

== Memory expansion system ==
A 512 KB RAM expansion card, the HYDRA "XTREME 512K CARD", is available and can be plugged into the expansion connector. It has two memory segments, a 64 KB completely randomly accessible segment, and a 448 KB linear accessible segment. During boot time the memory interface can be programmed to optionally auto-increment or -decrement the memory pointer for faster memory access. But the interface is based on a reprogrammable CPLD chip, so the access method can be re-programmed to suit the application; for most applications the chosen method is optimal for speed (for the 64 KB segment) and utility.

The memory expansion card also has its own 128 KB EEPROM on board.

== See also ==
- XGameStation
- Game development kits
