= Parallax, Inc. =

Parallax Inc.
- Company type: Private
- Industry: Technology
- Founded: 1987 Rocklin, California
- Headquarters: 599 Menlo Drive, Suite 100 Rocklin, California
- Key people: Ken Gracey (President); Chip Gracey (Founder, Director of Research & Development)
- Products: BASIC Stamp, Parallax SX, Parallax Propeller
- Website: www.parallax.com

Parallax Inc. is a privately held company in Rocklin, California. Parallax Inc. designs, manufactures, and sells BASIC Stamp microcontrollers, Propeller microcontrollers, microcontroller accessories (such as LCDs, sensors, RF modules, etc.), educational robot kits, and educational curriculum.

Parallax is headquartered in Rocklin. The Rocklin office employs thirty-five people in research and development, sales, manufacturing, education, marketing, and technical support. Parallax Inc. has over seventy distributors around the world, including Jameco Electronics.

== History ==
Originally established in 1987, in Rocklin, California, Parallax Inc. manufactured products such as the ISEPIC, TopRAM, and the first third-party Microchip PIC Programmer. In 1992, the BASIC Stamp 1 microcontroller module was released. In 1995, the BASIC Stamp 2 module was added to the product lineup. By 2002, there were over three million BASIC Stamp microcontrollers in use around the world.

In 1997, the Stamps in Class program was created to provide educational resources that addressed the needs of electronic students ages 14 and up. The Boe-Bot is one of the company’s most popular products in the educational program.

In 1998, Parallax Inc. formed a partnership with Ubicom (formerly Scenix Semiconductor) to develop tools and BASIC Stamps using their new SX microcontrollers. Company founder Chip Gracey designed the SX-Key Programming Tool to make programming Ubicom’s SX chips affordable. And in 2005, Parallax Inc. and Ubicom formed an agreement in which Parallax Inc. was made the exclusive supplier of the SX microcontroller.

In 2006, after eight years of development time, Parallax launched their Parallax Propeller microcontroller.

The Propeller 2 multicore processor is under development and does not have a release date yet. The Propeller 2 processor includes features commonly requested by customers such as code protection, additional RAM and more input/output pins.

== Popular chips and robots ==
=== The Propeller chip ===
The Propeller is a multicore system that can do real-time simultaneous multiprocessing. It uses eight 32-bit cores called cogs controlled by a bus controller called the Hub. It can be programmed in assembly, C, or in the interpreted Spin programming language. It comes with a software library of objects for a various sets of input/output devices, such as UARTs and a video display controller emulated fully in software. The Propeller is also supported by third-party compiler developers who have developed platforms in C and BASIC. The Parallax Propeller is also recognized as being easy to program.

=== The BASIC Stamp and BASIC Stamp 2 ===
Released in 1995, the BASIC Stamp was so named because it was about the size of a postage stamp. Programmed in PBASIC, the BASIC Stamp found an audience in electronic hobbyists with powerful I/O commands that made it easy to connect to other electronic components.

=== The Boe-Bot ===
The Boe-Bot is a programmable wheeled robot with a BASIC Stamp 2 brain that is used by educators and hobbyists. After being introduced in 1998, it is one of Parallax's top selling robots.

=== Sensors ===
Parallax manufactures sensors to measure distance, color, humidity, temperature, pressure, RPMs, heat, and altitude. These sensors are either surface-mounted components on a printed circuit board or in packages that are readily acceptable for breadboard-style mounting. Each sensor is supported with educational curriculum and documentation.

== Education ==
=== Stamps in Class ===
Launched in 1997, Stamps In Class curriculum was designed to introduce students and educators to BASIC Stamp microcontrollers using software basics, circuit building, and simple hardware. One tutorial in the Stamps in Class series is the Boe-Bot, a simple yet versatile rolling robot that has a BASIC Stamp brain.

=== Propeller education labs ===
The Propeller education program was developed to teach how to operate the Propeller chip. The Propeller features eight 32-bit processors. The Propeller education program demonstrates how to program the microcontroller for use in process control, measurement and signal generation and robotics. The program is designed for engineering students who have product design requirements in their curriculum.

== Featured in magazines ==
Filling a niche in the technology market by offering robotics for hobbyists, enthusiasts, and students, Parallax has been featured in magazines including: Make Magazine, SERVO Magazine, Robot Magazine, and Nuts and Volts.

== Unofficial Propeller Expo ==
=== History ===
The original UPE, the Unofficial Propeller Expo North East (UPENE) was hosted by a long time Parallax Forum member, "Oldbitcollector." He labeled it "Unofficial" so hobbyists could meet and exchange projects, ideas, and advice about Parallax robotics without getting permission to host an "Official Propeller Expo." However, Parallax came on board and now many Parallax employees can be found at each expo, talking with hobbyists, students, and inventors.

=== Unofficial Propeller Expo North East (UPENE) ===
The UPENE was an annual event located in Norwalk, Ohio, at the Norwalk Community Center. The expo consists of educators, engineers, hobbyists and students setting up tables and sharing their experiments, demonstrations, and products based on or inspired by microcontrollers such as the Parallax Propeller. The UPENE was the first of the three existing UPE's. As Parallax unofficially sponsors the expo, the company was joined by a second sponsor: the company Gadget Gangster.

=== Unofficial Propeller Expo Chicago (UPEC) ===
The UPEC, also known as the "Chicagoland Propeller Expo," was a one-day event held at the 807 Building in Ottawa, Illinois.

=== Unofficial Propeller Expo West (UPEW) ===
The UPEW, was the only one of the three UPE's to be located at Parallax's offices in Rocklin, California. This UPE also offers a special educator's course hosted by Parallax's engineer and author Andy Lindsay.

== The Parallax forum ==
Before 2004, the Parallax product user support forum was hosted in Yahoo! Discussion Groups. In 2004, this discussion group was moved from Yahoo! to Parallax Forums, located through Parallax's website. Members frequently discuss projects, programming, and products designed around the BASIC Stamp and Propeller Chip. Also, students can use the forums as a place to ask questions and receive direction to solve homework and projects.

== Products sold ==
=== Microcontrollers ===
- BASIC Stamp
- Propeller
- Propeller 2

=== Robots ===
- Boe-Bot
- ActivityBot 360 Robot Kit
- Robot Shield with Arduino
- SumoBot
- Scribbler 2
- ELEV-8 Quadcopter

=== Other products ===
- PING))) Ultrasonic Distance Sensor
- RFID Reader Module
- Spinneret web server board

=== Discontinued robots and products ===
- Scribbler
- Penguin Robot - small two-legged walking robot
- HexCrawler -Parallax had teamed up with Crust Crawler Robotics to create the HexCrawler.
- Toddler - two-legged walking robot
- Parallax SX
- Digital In/Out Board
- BASIC Stamp OEM Kits
- Propeller Demo Board
- Javelin Stamp
- Spin Stamp
- HYDRA Game Development Kit
