= BASIC Stamp =

Microcontrollers

Diagram of a BASIC Stamp 2

The BASIC Stamp is a microcontroller with a small, specialized BASIC interpreter (PBASIC) built into ROM. It is made by Parallax, Inc. and has been popular with electronics hobbyists since the early 1990s.

== Technical specifications ==
Although the BASIC Stamp 2 has the form of a 24-pin DIP chip, it is in fact a small printed circuit board (PCB) that contains the essential elements of a microprocessor system:

- A Microcontroller containing the CPU, a built in ROM containing the BASIC interpreter, and various peripherals
- 2kB of i²C EEPROM memory.
- A clock, in the form of a ceramic resonator
- Voltage regulator
- External input/output

The end result is that a hobbyist can connect a 9 V battery to a BASIC Stamp and have a complete system. A serial connection to a personal computer allows the programmer to download software to the BASIC Stamp, which is stored in the onboard non-volatile memory device: it remains programmed until it is erased or reprogrammed, even when the power of the stamp is removed. If the power is reconnected the stamp immediately starts executing the program in slot 0 (of 8, numbered 0..7).

== Programming ==
The BASIC Stamp is programmed in a variant of the BASIC language, called PBASIC. PBASIC incorporates common microcontroller functions, including PWM, serial communications, I²C and 1-Wire communications, communications with common LCD driver circuits, hobby servo pulse trains, pseudo-sine wave frequencies, and the ability to time an RC circuit which may be used to detect an analog value.

Once a program has been written in the 'Stamp Editor', an integrated development environment (IDE) in Windows, the syntax can be checked, tokenized and sent to the chip through a serial/USB Mini-B cable, where it will run.

== Versions ==
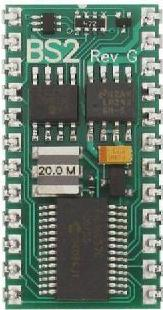
The BASIC Stamp 2

There are currently four variants of the interpreter:

1. (1992) BASIC Stamp 1 (BS1)
2. (1995) BASIC Stamp 2 (BS2), with six sub-variants:
  1. BS2e
  2. BS2sx
  3. BS2p24
  4. BS2p40
  5. BS2pe
  6. BS2px
3. (2002) Javelin Stamp
4. (2006) Propeller\Spin Stamp

The BS2 sub-variants feature more memory, higher execution speed, additional specialized PBASIC commands, extra I/O pins, etc., in comparison to the original BS2 model. While the BS1 and BS2 use a PIC, the remaining BASIC Stamp 2 variants use a Parallax SX processor.

The third variant is the Javelin Stamp. This module uses a subset of Sun Microsystems' Java programming language instead of Parallax's PBASIC. It does not include any networking facilities.

The fourth variant is the Spin Stamp. The module is based on the Parallax Propeller and therefore uses the SPIN programming language instead of PBASIC.

A number of companies now make "clones" of the BASIC Stamp with additional features, such as faster execution, analog-to-digital converters and hardware-based PWM which can run in the background.

The Parallax Propeller is gradually accumulating software libraries which give it functionality similar to the BASIC Stamp; however, there is no uniform list of which PBASIC facilities now have Spin equivalents.

== See also ==
- Arduino
- ARM-based PCB pin compatible with Parallax BASIC stamp
- ioBridge
- Make Controller Kit
- OOPic
- PICAXE
