= PEEC =

PEEC could refer to:

- Parramatta Easy English Congregation
- Partial element equivalent circuit
