= Electrical connector =

Device used to join electrical conductors

Schematic symbols for male and female connectors

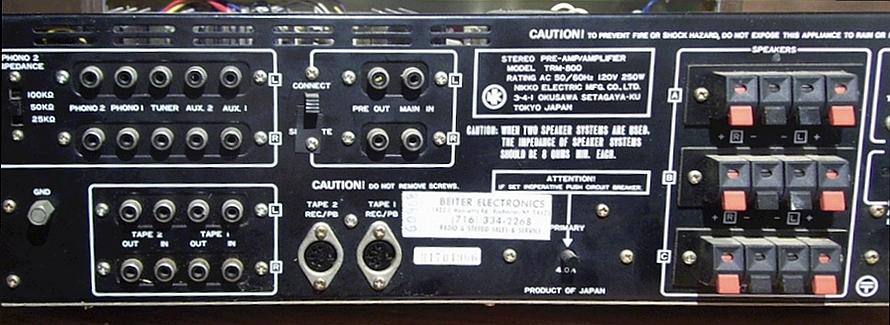
This rear panel of an integrated amplifier features a variety of electrical connectors

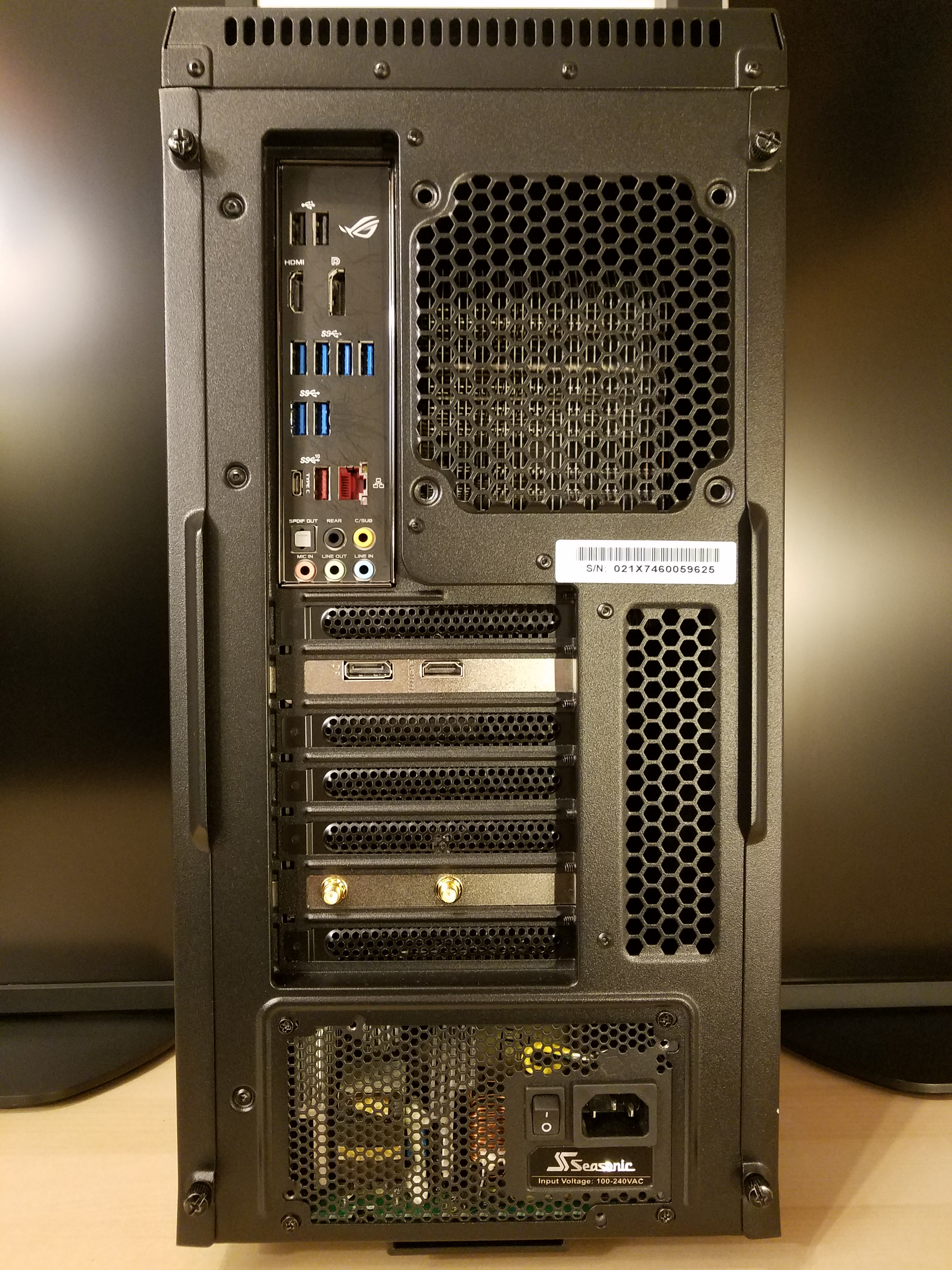
Connectors on the back of a 2018 computer

Components of an electrical circuit are electrically connected if an electric current can run between them through an electrical conductor. An electrical connector is an electromechanical device used to create an electrical connection between parts of an electrical circuit, or between different electrical circuits, thereby joining them into a larger circuit.

The connection may be removable (as for portable equipment), require a tool for assembly and removal, or serve as a permanent electrical joint between two points. An adapter can be used to join dissimilar connectors. Most electrical connectors have a gender – i.e. the male component, called a plug, connects to the female component, or socket.

Thousands of configurations of connectors are manufactured for power, data, and audiovisual applications. Electrical connectors can be divided into four basic categories, differentiated by their function:

- Inline or cable connectors permanently attached to a cable, so it can be plugged into another terminal (either a stationary instrument or another cable)
- Chassis or panel connectors permanently attached to a piece of equipment so users can connect a cable to a stationary device
- PCB mount connectors soldered to a printed circuit board, providing a point for cable or wire attachment. (e.g. pin headers, screw terminals, board-to-board connectors)
- Splice or butt connectors (primarily insulation displacement connectors) that permanently join two lengths of wire or cable

In computing, electrical connectors are considered a physical interface and constitute part of the physical layer in the OSI model of networking.

== Physical construction ==
In addition to the classes mentioned above, connectors are characterised by their pinout, method of connection, materials, size, contact resistance, insulation, mechanical durability, ingress protection, lifetime (number of cycles), and ease of use.

It is usually desirable for a connector to be easy to identify visually, rapid to assemble, inexpensive, and require only simple tooling. In some cases an equipment manufacturer might choose a connector specifically because it is not compatible with those from other sources, allowing control of what may be connected. No single connector has all the ideal properties for every application; the proliferation of types is a result of the diverse yet specific requirements of manufacturers.

=== Materials ===
Electrical connectors essentially consist of two classes of materials: conductors and insulators. Properties important to conductor materials are contact resistance, conductivity, mechanical strength, formability, and resilience. Insulators must have a high electrical resistance, withstand high temperatures, and be easy to manufacture for a precise fit

Electrodes in connectors are usually made of copper alloys, due to their good conductivity and malleability. Alternatives include brass, phosphor bronze, and beryllium copper. The base electrode metal is often coated with another inert metal such as gold, nickel, or tin. The use of a coating material with good conductivity, mechanical robustness and corrosion resistance helps to reduce the influence of passivating oxide layers and surface adsorbates, which limit metal-to-metal contact patches and contribute to contact resistance. For example, copper alloys have favorable mechanical properties for electrodes, but are hard to solder and prone to corrosion. Thus, copper pins are usually coated with gold to alleviate these pitfalls, especially for analog signals and high-reliability applications.

Contact carriers that hold the parts of a connector together are usually made of plastic, due to its insulating properties. Housings or backshells can be made of molded plastic and metal. Connector bodies for high-temperature use, such as thermocouples or associated with large incandescent lamps, may be made of fired ceramic material.

Many electrical connectors used in electronics, for example edge connectors on printed circuit boards, are plated with gold to allow for low-voltage, low-resistance transmission of signals with high signal integrity because gold has no surface oxide layer and does not typically corrode in air. Alternatives such as Palladium-nickel or pure nanocrystaline nickel with a gold flash layer have been explored to reduce the amount of gold used and associated cost.

=== Failure modes ===
The majority of connector failures result in intermittent connections or open contacts:

Failure mode	Relative probability
Open circuit	61%
Poor contact	23%
Short circuit	16%

Connectors are purely passive components – that is, they do not enhance the function of a circuit – so connectors should affect the function of a circuit as little as possible. Insecure mounting of connectors (primarily chassis-mounted) can contribute significantly to the risk of failure, especially when subjected to extreme shock or vibration. Other causes of failure are connectors inadequately rated for the applied current and voltage, connectors with inadequate ingress protection, and threaded backshells that are worn or damaged.

High temperatures can also cause failure in connectors, resulting in an "avalanche" of failures – ambient temperature increases, leading to a decrease in insulation resistance and increase in conductor resistance; this increase generates more heat, and the cycle repeats.

Fretting (so-called dynamic corrosion) is a common failure mode in electrical connectors that have not been specifically designed to prevent it, especially in those that are frequently mated and de-mated. Surface corrosion is a risk for many metal parts in connectors, and can cause contacts to form a thin surface layer that increases resistance, thus contributing to heat buildup and intermittent connections. However, remating or reseating a connector can alleviate the issue of surface corrosion, since each cycle scrapes a microscopic layer off the surface of the contact(s), exposing a fresh, unoxidised surface.

=== Circular connectors ===
Many connectors used for industrial and high-reliability applications are circular in cross section, with a cylindrical housing and circular contact interface geometries. This is in contrast to the rectangular design of some connectors, e.g. USB or blade connectors. They are commonly used for easier engagement and disengagement, tight environmental sealing, and rugged mechanical performance. They are widely used in military, aerospace, industrial machinery, and rail, where MIL-DTL-5015 and MIL-DTL-38999 are commonly specified. Fields such as sound engineering and radio communication also use circular connectors, such as XLR and BNC. AC power plugs are also commonly circular, for example, Schuko plugs and IEC 60309.

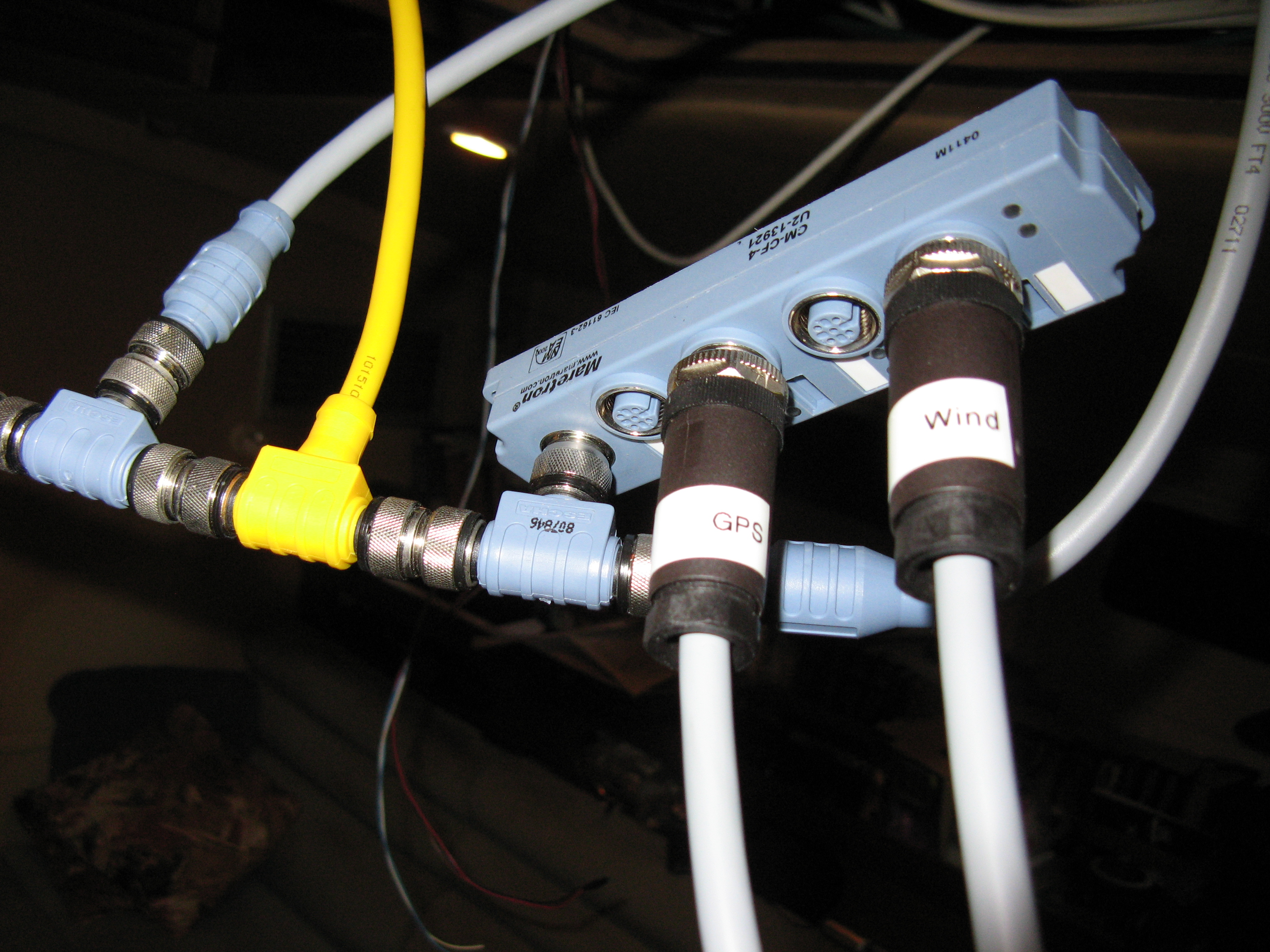
NMEA 2000 cabling using M12 connectors

The M12 connector, specified in IEC 61076-2-101, is a circular electrical plug/receptacle pair with 12mm OD mating threads, used in NMEA 2000, DeviceNet, IO-Link, some kinds of Industrial Ethernet, etc.

A disadvantage of the circular design is its inefficient use of panel space when used in arrays, when compared to rectangular connectors.

Circular connectors commonly use backshells, which provide physical and electromagnetic protection, whilst sometimes also providing a method for locking the connector into a receptacle. In some cases, this backshell provides a hermetic seal, or some degree of ingress protection, through the use of grommets, O-rings, or potting.

=== Hybrid connectors ===
Hybrid connectors allow the intermixing of many connector types, usually by way of a housing with inserts. These housings may also allow intermixing of electrical and non-electrical interfaces, examples of the latter being pneumatic line connectors, and optical fiber connectors. Because hybrid connectors are modular in nature, they tend to simplify assembly, repair, and future modifications. They also allow the creation of composite cable assemblies that can reduce equipment installation time by reducing the number of individual cable and connector assemblies.

== Mechanical features ==
=== Pin sequence ===
Some connectors are designed such that certain pins make contact before others when inserted, and break first on disconnection. This is often used in power connectors to protect equipment, e.g. connecting safety ground first. It is also employed for digital signals, as a method to sequence connections properly in hot swapping.

=== Keying ===
Examples of keyed connectors

XLR connector, showing the notch for alignment

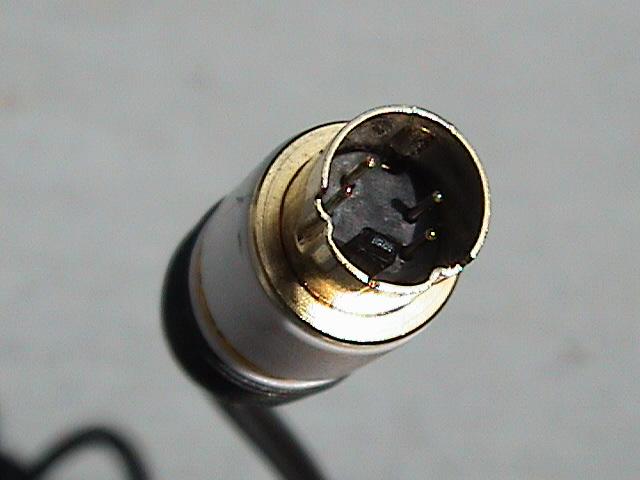
A 4-pin Mini-DIN S-Video cable, with notches and a rectangular alignment pin

Many connectors are keyed with some mechanical component (sometimes called a keyway), which prevents mating in an incorrect orientation. This can be used to prevent mechanical damage to connectors, from being jammed in at the wrong angle or into the wrong connector, or to prevent incompatible or dangerous electrical connections, such as plugging an audio cable into a power outlet. Keying also prevents otherwise symmetrical connectors from being connected in the wrong orientation or polarity. Keying is particularly important for situations where there are many similar connectors, such as in signal electronics. For instance, XLR connectors have a notch to ensure proper orientation, while Mini-DIN plugs have a plastic projection that fits into a corresponding hole in the socket (they also have a notched metal skirt to provide secondary keying).

=== Locking mechanisms ===
Some connector housings are designed with locking mechanisms to prevent inadvertent disconnection or poor environmental sealing. Locking mechanism designs include locking levers of various sorts, jackscrews, screw-in shells, push-pull connector, and toggle or bayonet systems. Some connectors, particularly those with large numbers of contacts, require high forces to connect and disconnect. Locking levers and jackscrews and screw-in shells for such connectors frequently serve both to retain the connector when connected and to provide the force needed for connection and disconnection. Depending on application requirements, housings with locking mechanisms may be tested under various environmental simulations that include physical shock and vibration, water spray, dust, etc. to ensure the integrity of the electrical connection and housing seals.

=== Backshells ===
Backshells are a common accessory for industrial and high-reliability connectors, especially circular connectors. Backshells typically protect the connector and/or cable from environmental or mechanical stress, or shield it from electromagnetic interference. Many types of backshells are available for different purposes, including various sizes, shapes, materials, and levels of protection. Backshells usually lock onto the cable with a clamp or moulded boot, and may be threaded for attachment to a mating receptacle. Backshells for military and aerospace use are regulated by SAE AS85049 within the USA.

=== Hyperboloid contacts ===
To deliver ensured signal stability in extreme environments, traditional pin and socket design may become inadequate. Hyperboloid contacts are designed to withstand more extreme physical demands, such as vibration and shock. They also require around 40% less insertion force – as low as 0.3 newtons (1 oz_{f}) per contact, – which extends the lifespan, and in some cases offers an alternative to zero insertion force connectors.

In a connector with hyperboloid contacts, each female contact has several equally spaced longitudinal wires twisted into a hyperbolic shape. These wires are highly resilient to strain, but still somewhat elastic, hence they essentially function as linear springs. As the male pin is inserted, axial wires in the socket half are deflected, wrapping themselves around the pin to provide a number of contact points. The internal wires that form the hyperboloid structure are usually anchored at each end by bending the tip into a groove or notch in the housing.

Whilst hyperboloid contacts may be the only option to make a reliable connection in some circumstances, they have the disadvantage of taking up greater volume in a connector, which can cause problems for high-density connectors. They are also significantly more expensive than traditional pin and socket contacts, which has limited their uptake since their invention in the 1920s by Wilhelm Harold Frederick. In the 1950s, Francois Bonhomme popularised hyperboloid contacts with his "Hypertac" connector, which was later acquired by Smiths Group. During the following decades, the connectors steadily gained popularity, and are still used for medical, industrial, military, aerospace, and rail applications (particularly trains in Europe).

=== Pogo pins ===
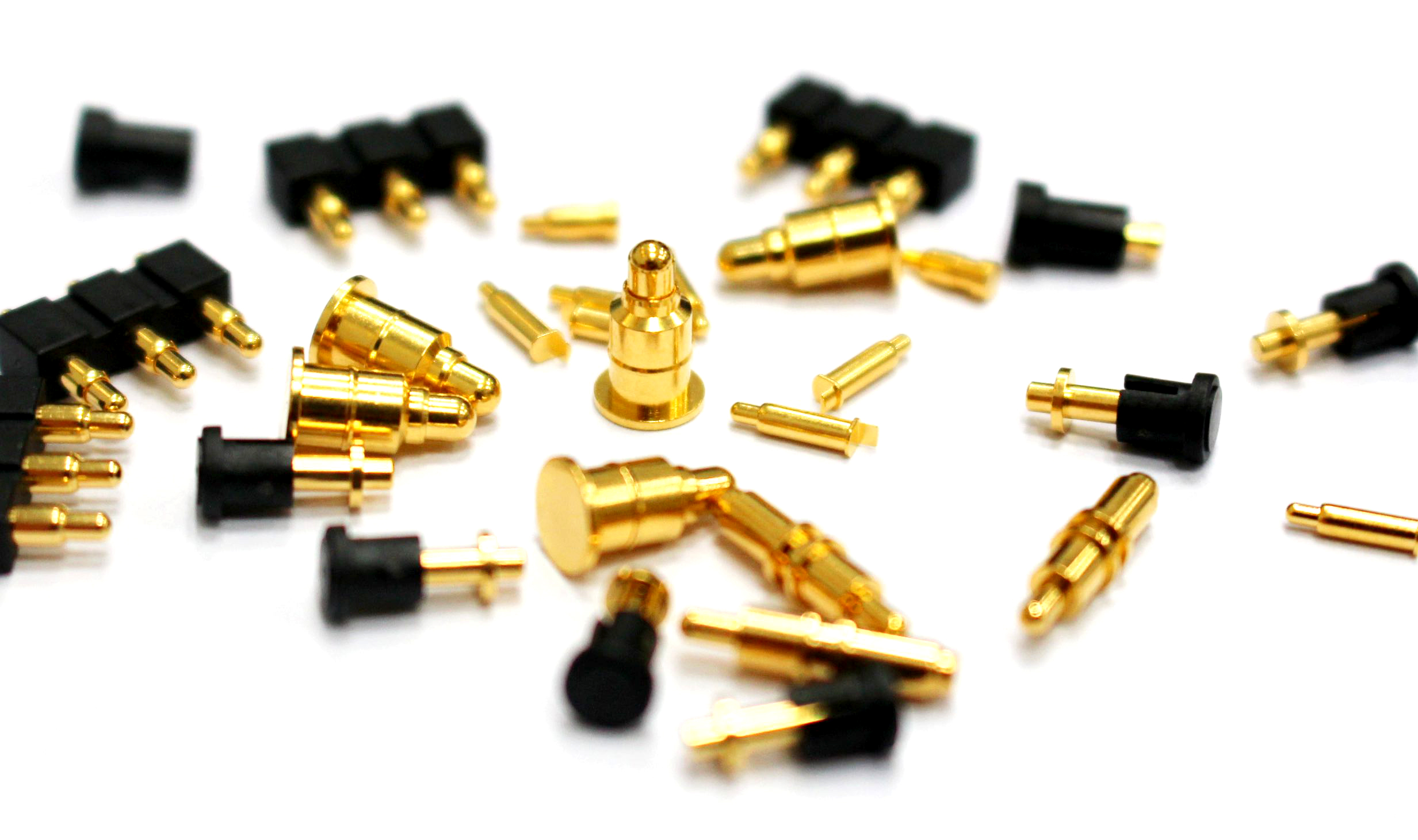
Pogo pin connectors

Pogo pin or spring loaded connectors are commonly used in consumer and industrial products, where mechanical resilience and ease of use are priorities. The connector consists of a barrel, a spring, and a plunger. They are in applications such as the MagSafe connector where a quick disconnect is desired for safety. Because they rely on spring pressure, not friction, they can be more durable and less damaging than traditional pin and socket design, leading to their use in in-circuit testing.

=== Crown spring connectors ===
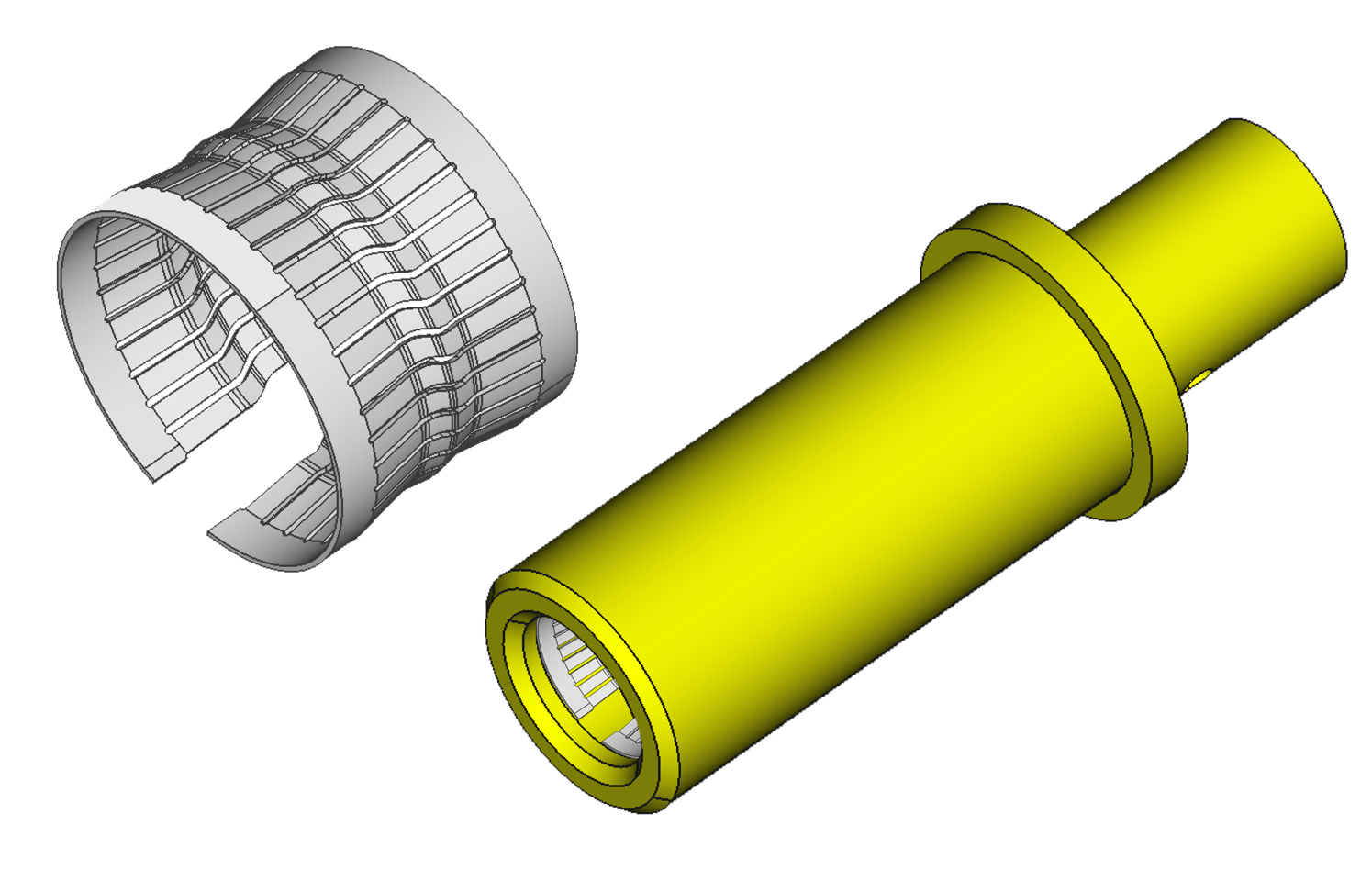
Typical crown spring plug and its female socket

Crown spring connectors are commonly used for higher current flows and industrial applications. They have a high number of contact points, which provides a more electrically reliable connection than traditional pin and socket connectors.

== Methods of connection ==
Plug and socket connectors

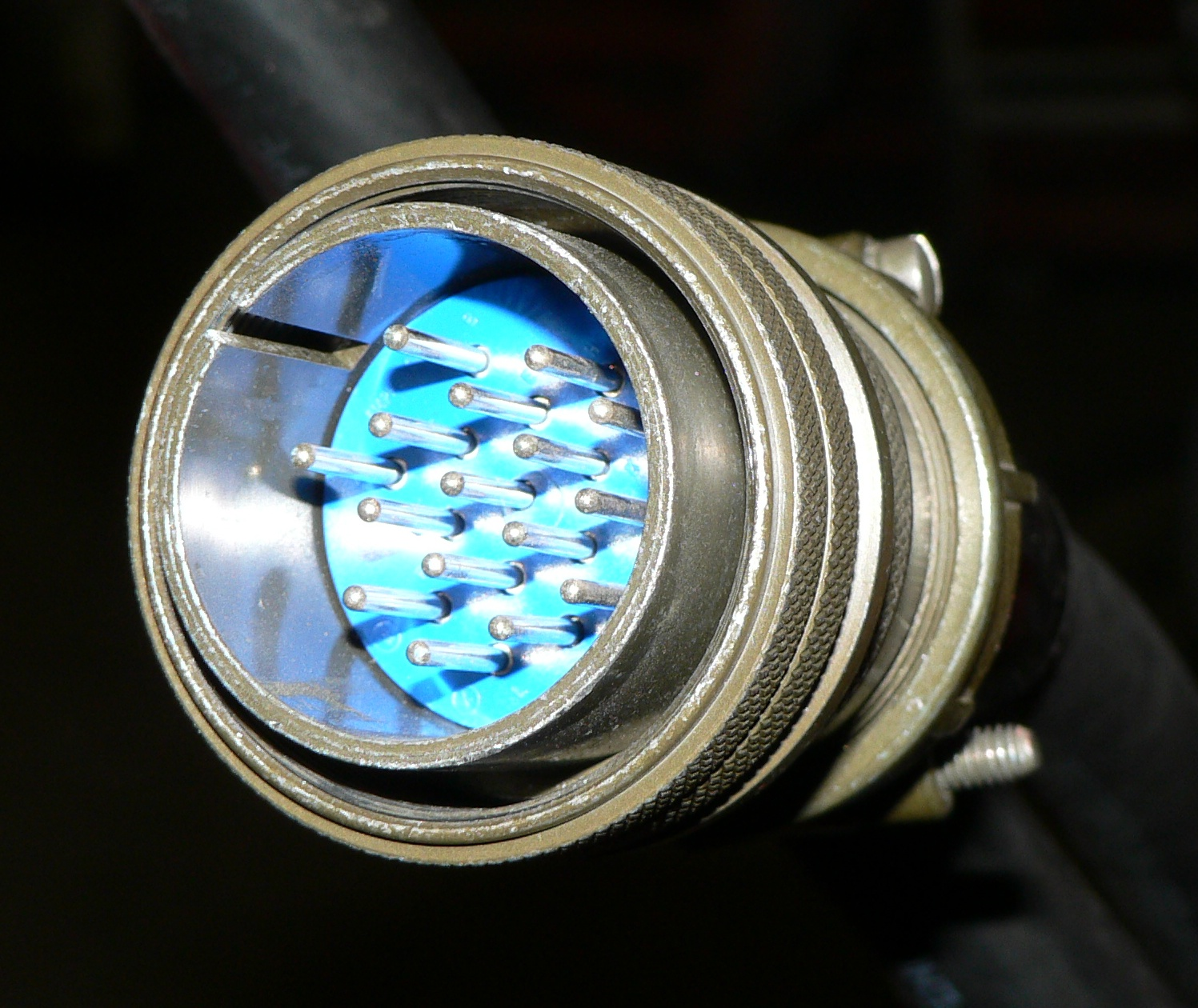
Male MIL-DTL-5015 plug

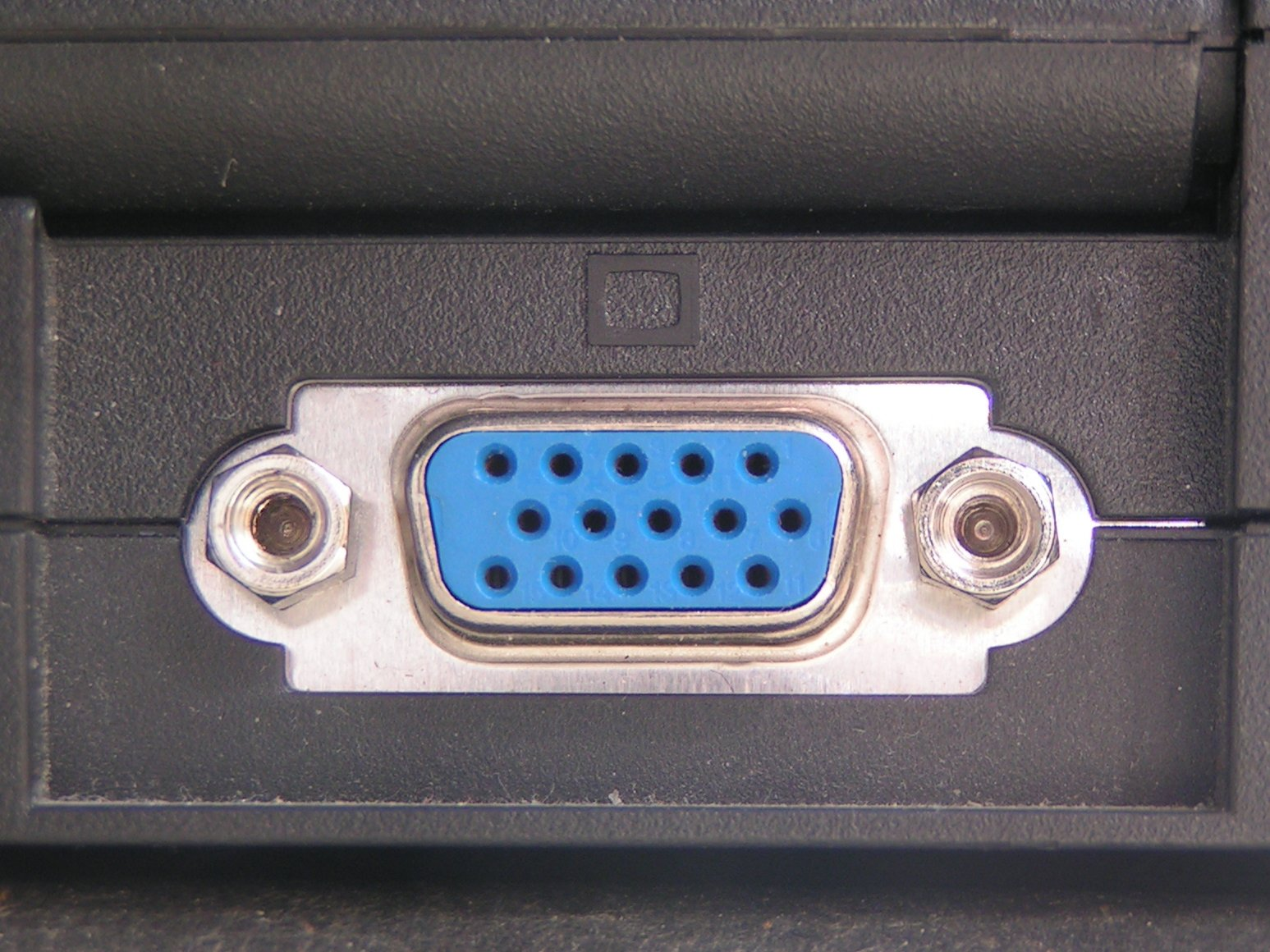
Female VGA connector

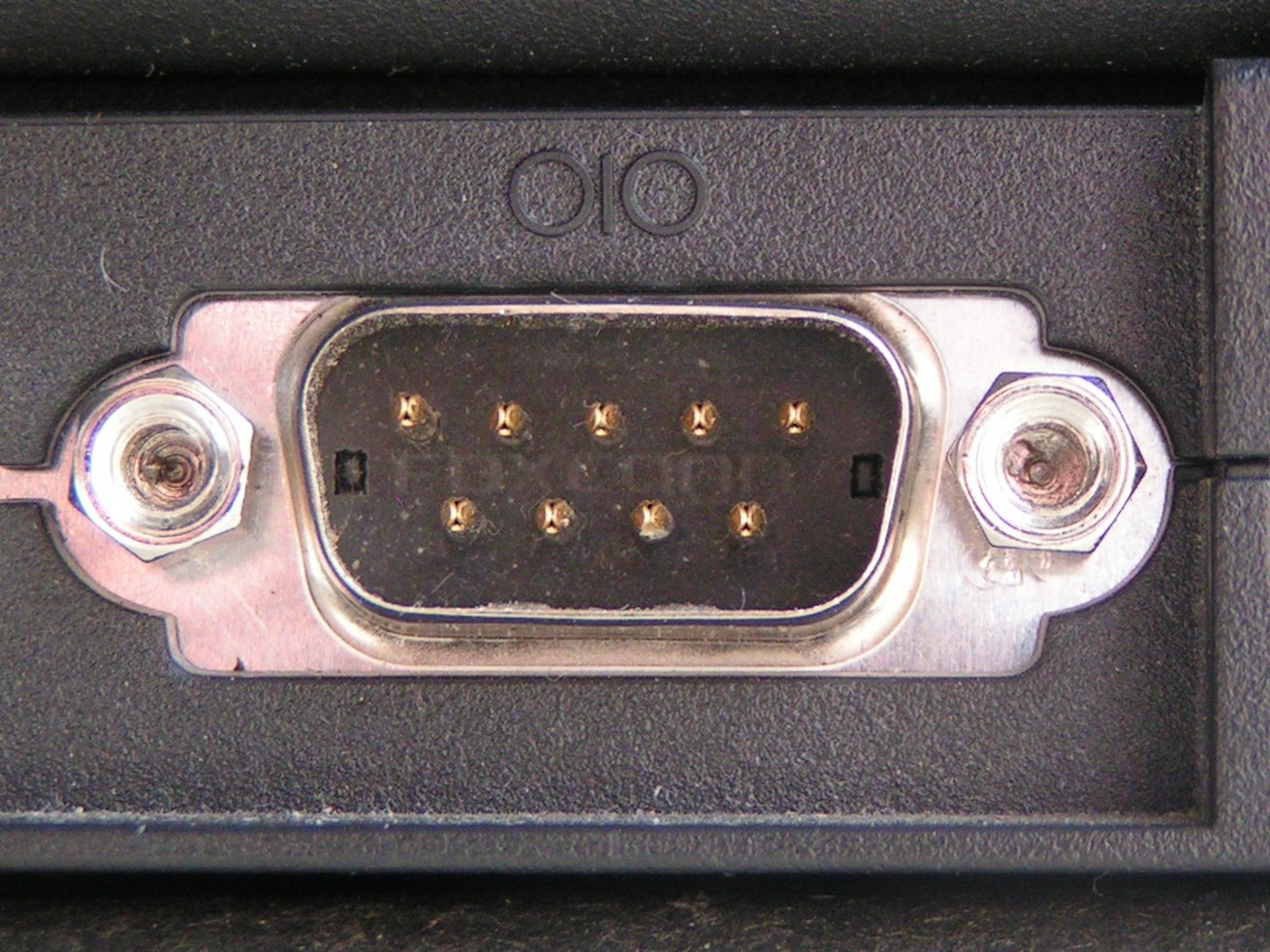
Male serial port connector

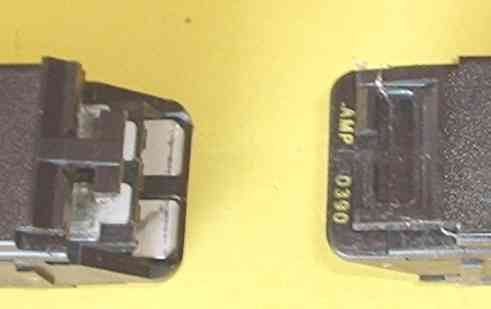
Mating surfaces of a hermaphroditic connector

Whilst technically inaccurate, electrical connectors can be viewed as a type of adapter to convert between two connection methods, which are permanently connected at one end and (usually) detachable at the other end. By definition, each end of this "adapter" has a different connection method – e.g. the solder tabs on a male phone connector, and the male phone connector itself. In this example, the solder tabs connected to the cable represent the permanent connection, whilst the male connector portion interfaces with a female socket forming a detachable connection.

There are many ways of applying a connector to a cable or device. Some of these methods can be accomplished without specialized tools. Other methods, while requiring a special tool, can assemble connectors much faster and more reliably, and make repairs easier.

The number of times a connector can connect and disconnect with its counterpart while meeting all its specifications is termed as mating cycles and is an indirect measure of connector lifespan. The material used for connector contact, plating type and thickness is a major factor that determines the mating cycles.

=== Plug and socket connectors ===
Plug and socket connectors are usually made up of a male plug (typically pin contacts) and a female socket (typically receptacle contacts). Often, but not always, sockets are permanently fixed to a device as in a chassis connector, and plugs are attached to a cable.

Plugs generally have one or more pins or prongs that are inserted into openings in the mating socket. The connection between the mating metal parts must be sufficiently tight to make a good electrical connection and complete the circuit. An alternative type of plug and socket connection uses hyperboloid contacts, which makes a more reliable electrical connection. When working with multi-pin connectors, it is helpful to have a pinout diagram to identify the wire or circuit node connected to each pin.

Some connector styles may combine pin and socket connection types in a single unit, referred to as a hermaphroditic connector. These connectors includes mating with both male and female aspects, involving complementary paired identical parts each containing both protrusions and indentations. These mating surfaces are mounted into identical fittings that freely mate with any other, without regard for gender (provided that the size and type match).

Sometimes both ends of a cable are terminated with the same gender of connector, as in many Ethernet patch cables. In other applications the two ends are terminated differently, either with male and female of the same connector (as in an extension cord), or with incompatible connectors, which is sometimes called an adapter cable.

Plugs and sockets are widely used in various connector systems including blade connectors, breadboards, XLR connectors, car power outlets, banana connectors, and phone connectors.

==== Jacks and plugs ====
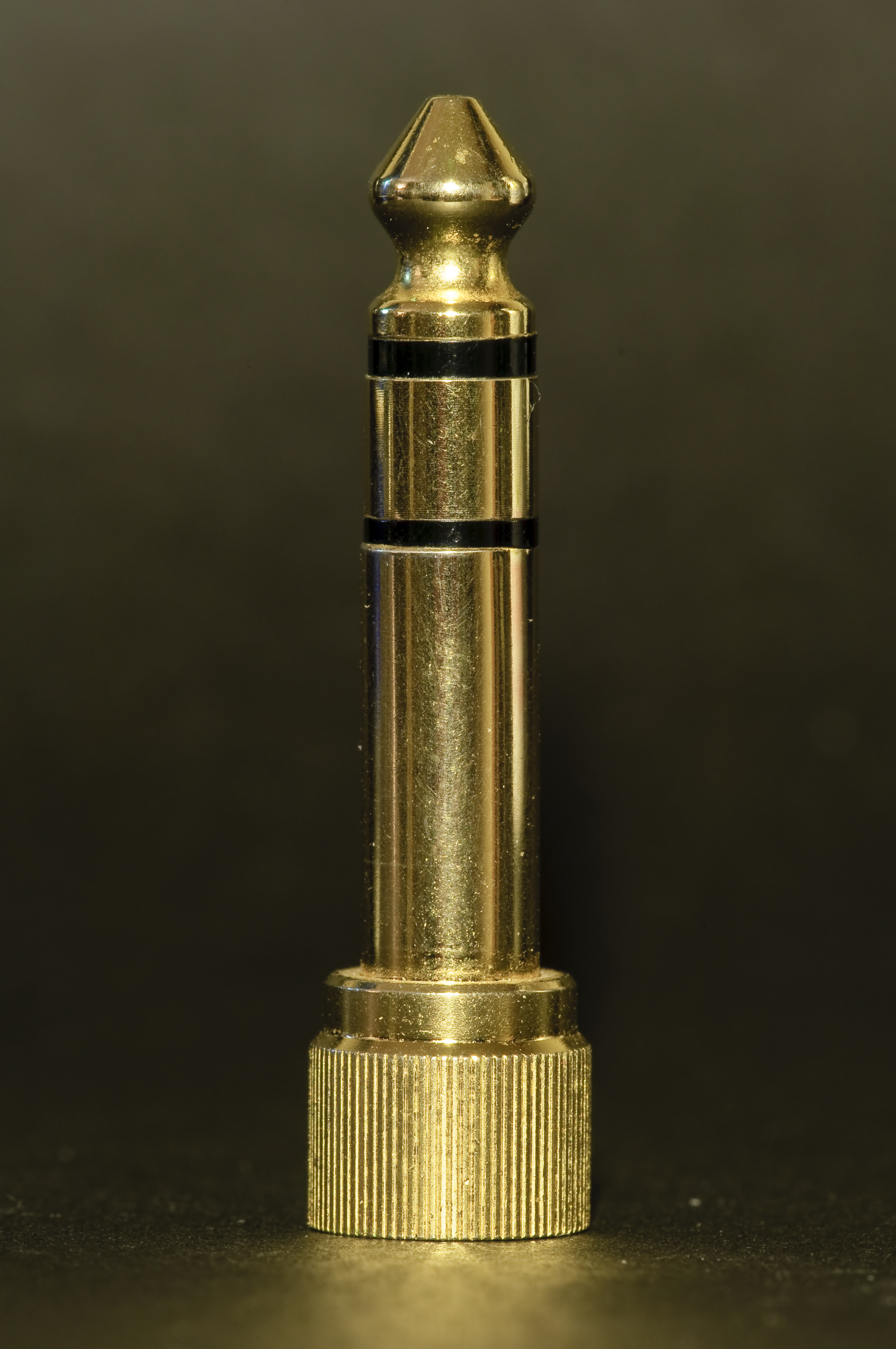
Male phone plug

A jack is a connector that installs on the surface of a bulkhead or enclosure, and mates with its reciprocal, the plug. According to the American Society of Mechanical Engineers, the stationary (more fixed) connector of a pair is classified as a jack (denoted J), usually attached to a piece of equipment as in a chassis-mount or panel-mount connector. The movable (less fixed) connector is classified as a plug (denoted P), designed to attach to a wire, cable or removable electrical assembly. This convention is currently defined in ASME Y14.44-2008, which supersedes IEEE 200-1975, which in turn derives from the long-withdrawn MIL-STD-16 (from the 1950s), highlighting the heritage of this connector naming convention. IEEE 315-1975 works alongside ASME Y14.44-2008 to define jacks and plugs.

The term jack occurs in several related terms:

- The registered jack or modular jack in RJ11, RJ45 and other similar connectors used for telecommunications and computer networking
- The telephone jack of manual telephone switchboards, which is the socket fitting the original 1/4 inch (6.35 mm) telephone plug
- The 1/4 inch (6.35 mm) phone jack common to many electronic applications in various configurations, sometimes referred to as a headphone jack
- The RCA jack, also known as a phono jack, common to consumer audiovisual electronics
- The barrel jack for low-voltage power, common to consumer electronics

=== Crimp-on connectors ===
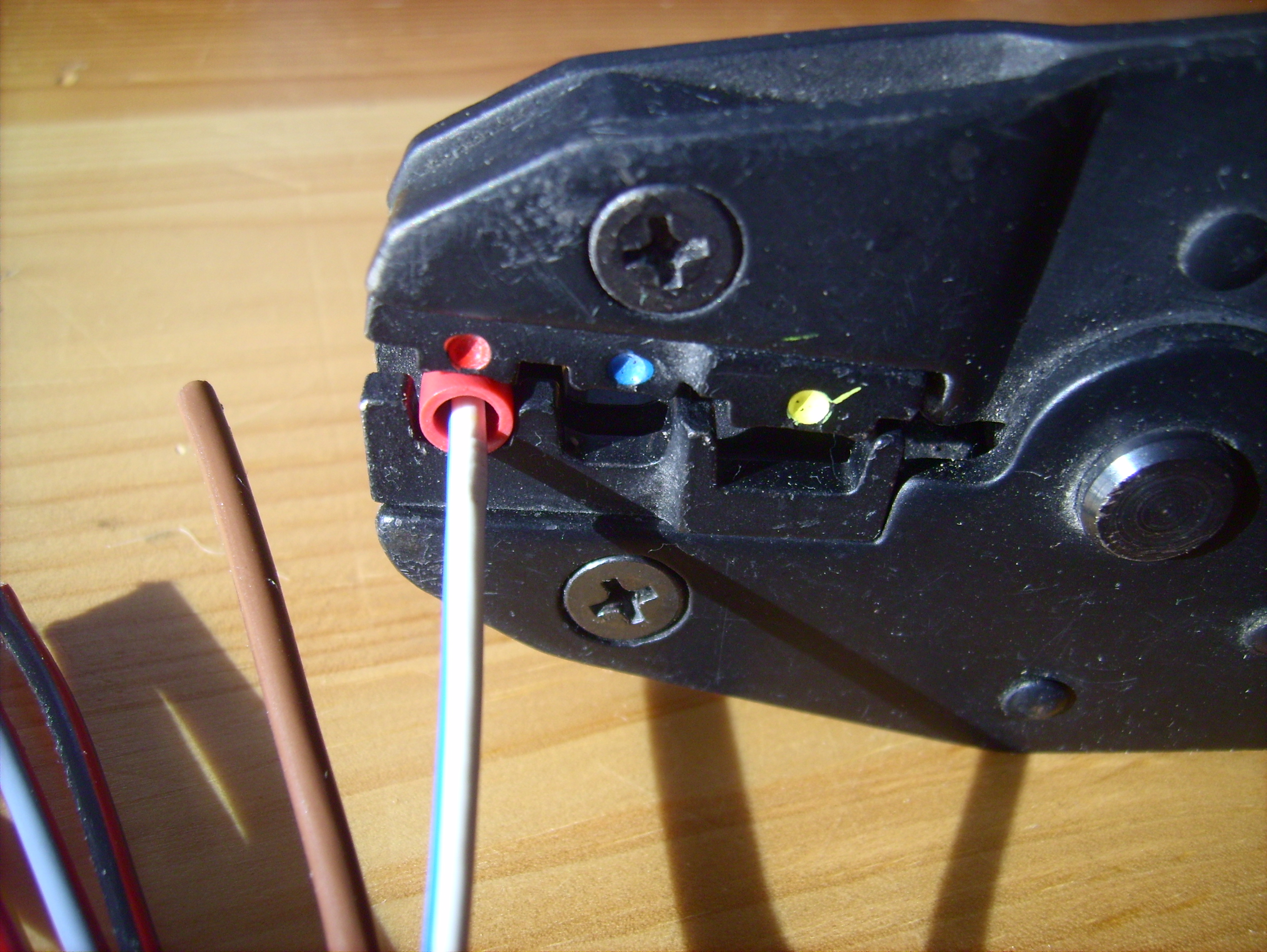
A wire and connector being crimped together with a crimping tool

Crimped connectors are a type of solderless connection, using mechanical friction and uniform deformation to secure a connector to a pre-stripped wire (usually stranded). Crimping is used in splice connectors, crimped multipin plugs and sockets, and crimped coaxial connectors. Crimping usually requires a specialised crimping tool, but the connectors are quick and easy to install and are a common alternative to solder connections or insulation displacement connectors. Effective crimp connections deform the metal of the connector past its yield point so that the compressed wire causes tension in the surrounding connector, and these forces counter each other to create a high degree of static friction. Due to the elastic element in crimped connections, they are highly resistant to vibration and thermal shock.

Crimped contacts are permanent (i.e. the connectors and wire ends cannot be reused).

Crimped plug-and-socket connectors can be classified as rear release or front release. This relates to the side of the connector where the pins are anchored:

- Front release contacts are released from the front (contact side) of the connector, and removed from the rear. The removal tool engages with the front portion of the contact and pushes it through to the back of the connector.
- Rear release contacts are released and removed from the rear (wire side) of the connector. The removal tool releases the contacts from the rear and pulls the contact out of the retainer.

=== Soldered connectors ===
Many plug and socket connectors are attached to a wire or cable by soldering conductors to electrodes on the back of the connector. Soldered joints in connectors are robust and reliable if executed correctly, but are usually slower to make than crimped connections. When wires are to be soldered to the back of a connector, a backshell is often used to protect the connection and add strain relief. Metal solder buckets or solder cups are provided, which consist of a cylindrical cavity that an installer fills with solder before inserting the wire.

When creating soldered connections, it is possible to melt the dielectric between pins or wires. This can cause problems because the thermal conductivity of metals causes heat to quickly distribute through the cable and connector, and when this heat melts plastic dielectric, it can cause short circuits or "flared" (conical) insulation. Solder joints are also more prone to mechanical failure than crimped joints when subjected to vibration and compression.

=== Insulation-displacement connectors ===
Since stripping insulation from wires is time-consuming, many connectors intended for rapid assembly use insulation-displacement connectors which cut the insulation as the wire is inserted. These generally take the form of a fork-shaped opening in the terminal, into which the insulated wire is pressed, which cut through the insulation to contact the conductor. To make these connections reliably on a production line, special tools accurately control the forces applied during assembly. On small scales, these tools tend to cost more than tools for crimped connections.

Insulation displacement connectors are usually used with small conductors for signal purposes and at low voltage. Power conductors carrying more than a few amperes are more reliably terminated with other means, though "hot tap" press-on connectors find some use in automotive applications for additions to existing wiring.

A common example is the multi-conductor flat ribbon cable used in computer disk drives; to terminate each of the many (approximately 40) wires individually would be slow and error-prone, but an insulation displacement connector can terminate all the wires in a single action. Another very common use is so-called punch-down blocks used for terminating unshielded twisted pair wiring.

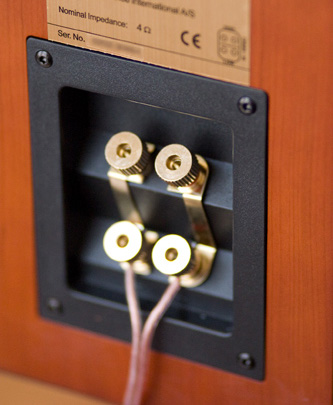
Binding posts on a bi-amplified loudspeaker

=== Binding posts ===
Binding posts are a single-wire connection method, where stripped wire is screwed or clamped to a metal electrode. Such connectors are frequently used in electronic test equipment and audio. Many binding posts also accept a banana plug.

=== Screw terminals ===
Screw connections are frequently used for semi-permanent wiring and connections inside devices, due to their simple but reliable construction. The basic principle of all screw terminals involves the tip of a bolt clamping onto a stripped conductor. They can be used to join multiple conductors, to connect wires to a printed circuit board, or to terminate a cable into a plug or socket. The clamping screw may act in the longitudinal axis (parallel to the wire) or the transverse axis (perpendicular to the wire), or both. Some disadvantages are that connecting wires is more difficult than simply plugging in a cable, and screw terminals are generally not very well protected from contact with persons or foreign conducting materials.

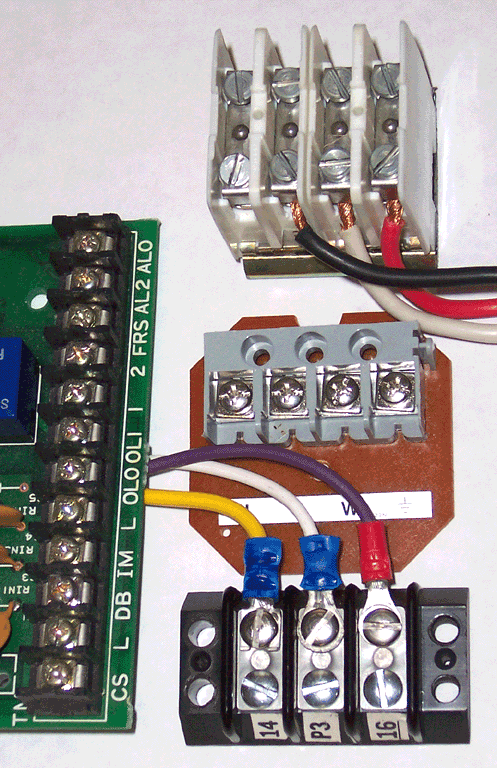
Terminal blocks of various types

Terminal blocks (also called terminal boards or strips) provide a convenient means of connecting individual electrical wires without a splice or physically joining the ends. Since terminal blocks are readily available for a wide range of wire sizes and terminal quantity, they are one of the most flexible types of electrical connector available. One type of terminal block accepts wires that are prepared only by stripping a short length of insulation from the end. Another type, often called barrier strips, accepts wires that have ring or spade terminal lugs crimped onto the wires.

Printed circuit board (PCB) mounted screw terminals let individual wires connect to a PCB through leads soldered to the board.

=== Ring and spade connectors ===
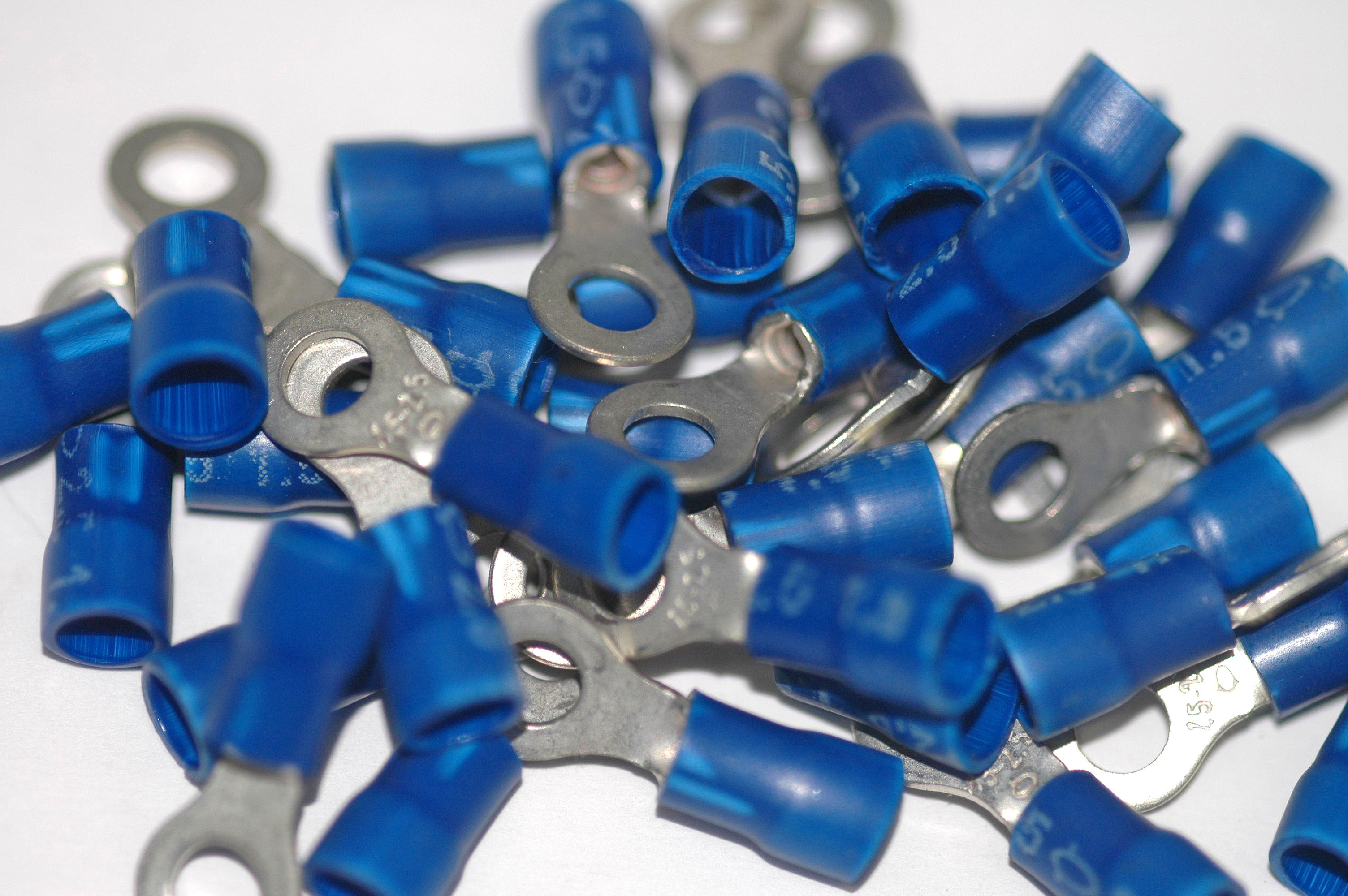
Ring style wire-end crimp connectors

The connectors in the top row of the image are known as ring terminals and spade terminals (sometimes called fork or split ring terminals). Electrical contact is made by the flat surface of the ring or spade, while mechanically they are attached by passing a screw or bolt through them. The spade terminal form factor facilitates connections since the screw or bolt can be left partially screwed in as the spade terminal is removed or attached. Their sizes can be determined by the gauge of the conducting wire, and the interior and exterior diameters.

In the case of insulated crimp connectors, the crimped area lies under an insulating sleeve through which the pressing force acts. During crimping, the extended end of this insulating sleeve is simultaneously pressed around the insulated area of the cable, creating strain relief. The insulating sleeve of insulated connectors has a color that indicates the wire's cross-section area. Colors are standardized according to DIN 46245:

- Red for cross-section areas from 0.5 to 1 mm²
- Blue for cross-section areas from 1.5 to 2.5 mm²
- Yellow for cross-section areas over 4 to 6 mm²

=== Blade connectors ===
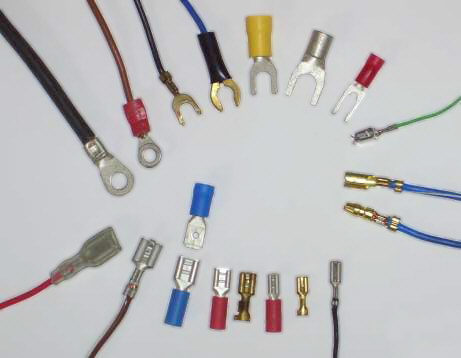
Blade connectors (lower half of photo). Ring and spade terminals (upper half). Bullet terminals, male and female (right-center, with blue wires)

A blade connector is a type of single wire, plug-and-socket connection device using a flat conductive blade (plug) that is inserted into a receptacle. Wires are typically attached to male or female blade connector terminals by either crimping or soldering. Insulated and uninsulated varieties are available. In some cases the blade is an integral manufactured part of a component (such as a switch or a speaker unit), and the reciprocal connector terminal is pushed onto the device's connector terminal.

=== Other connection methods ===
- Alligator and Crocodile clips – conductive clamps used for temporary connections, e.g. jumper cables
- Board to board connectors – e.g. card-edge connectors or FPGA mezzanine connectors
- Twist-on wire connectors (e.g. wire nuts) – used in low-voltage power circuits for wires up to about 10 AWG
- Wire wrapping – used in older circuit boards

== See also ==
- Adapter
- Bent pin analysis
- Cable gland
- Electrical contact
- Electrical network
- Electrical termination
- Electrical terminal
- Gender of connectors and fasteners
- InCa3D
- Lightbulb socket
- Line splice
- Pothead for a termination on a high voltage electric power cable
- RF connector
- Tee connector
- Tube socket
- Twist-on wire connector

=== Connectors ===
- AC power plugs and sockets
- Audio and video interfaces and connectors
- Banana connector
- Battery holder
- Battery terminal
- Coaxial power connector
- Computer port (hardware)
- Crocodile clip
- DC connector
- DIN connector
- Dock connector
- D-sub connectors
- Edge connector
- Elastomeric connector
- IEC appliance couplers (IEC 60320)
- JST connector
- Mini-DIN connector
- Optical fiber connector
- Phone connector (audio)
- Pin header
- RCA connector
- RJ-XX connector
- Flexible electronics
