= InCa3D =

Electronic simulation software

InCa3D is a simulation tool dedicated to electrical connection modelling for both:

- Electromagnetic compatibility
- Power electronics

The software employs finite element analysis based on the PEEC Partial element equivalent circuit method which proved to be efficient to solve Maxwell's equations in low and middle frequency, thanks to its ability to convert interconnections geometry into equivalent RLC circuit, thus avoiding polygonal meshing of the air around the device.

InCa3D is developed in France (in collaboration with G2ELab) and distributed by Altair Engineering Inc.

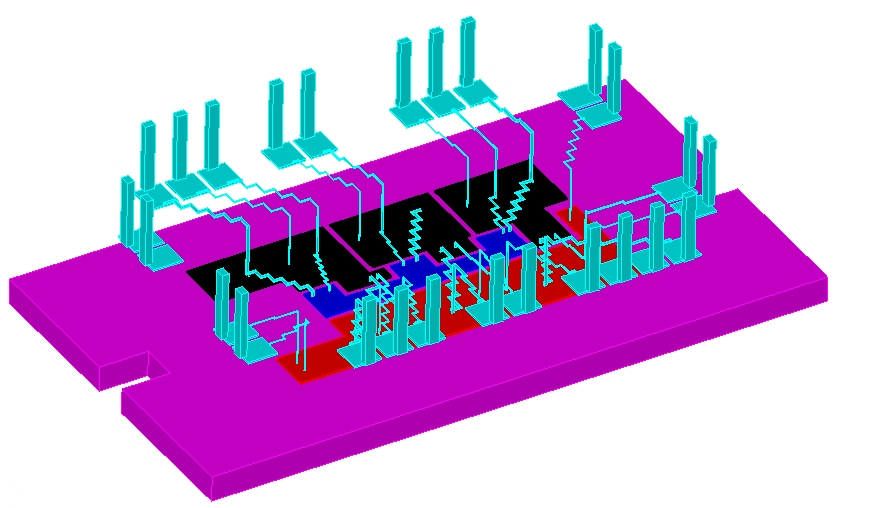
Power module modelisation with InCa3D

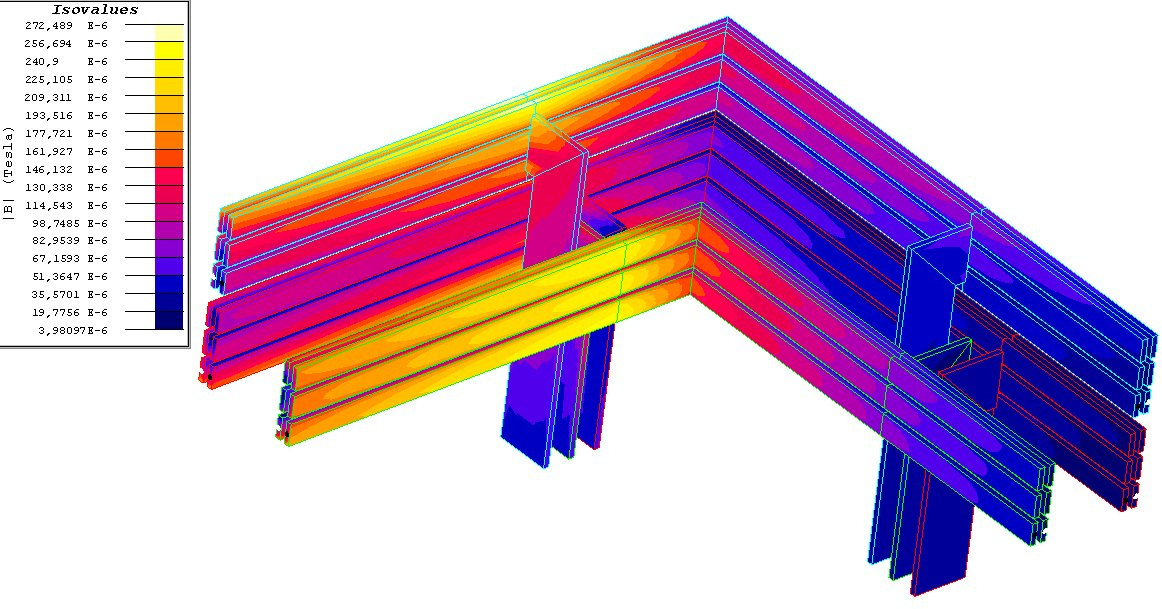
Magnetic field computation on distribution bars with InCa3D

== Main application fields ==
InCa3D is well suited for modelling the behaviour of various connectors:

- from ICs, small wire bonds and PCBs tracks,
- up to bus bars, power modules and large distribution switchboards.

== Other links ==
Partial element equivalent circuit method
Busbar Design: How to Spare Nanohenries ?
