= Adapter (computing) =

Adapter used in computing

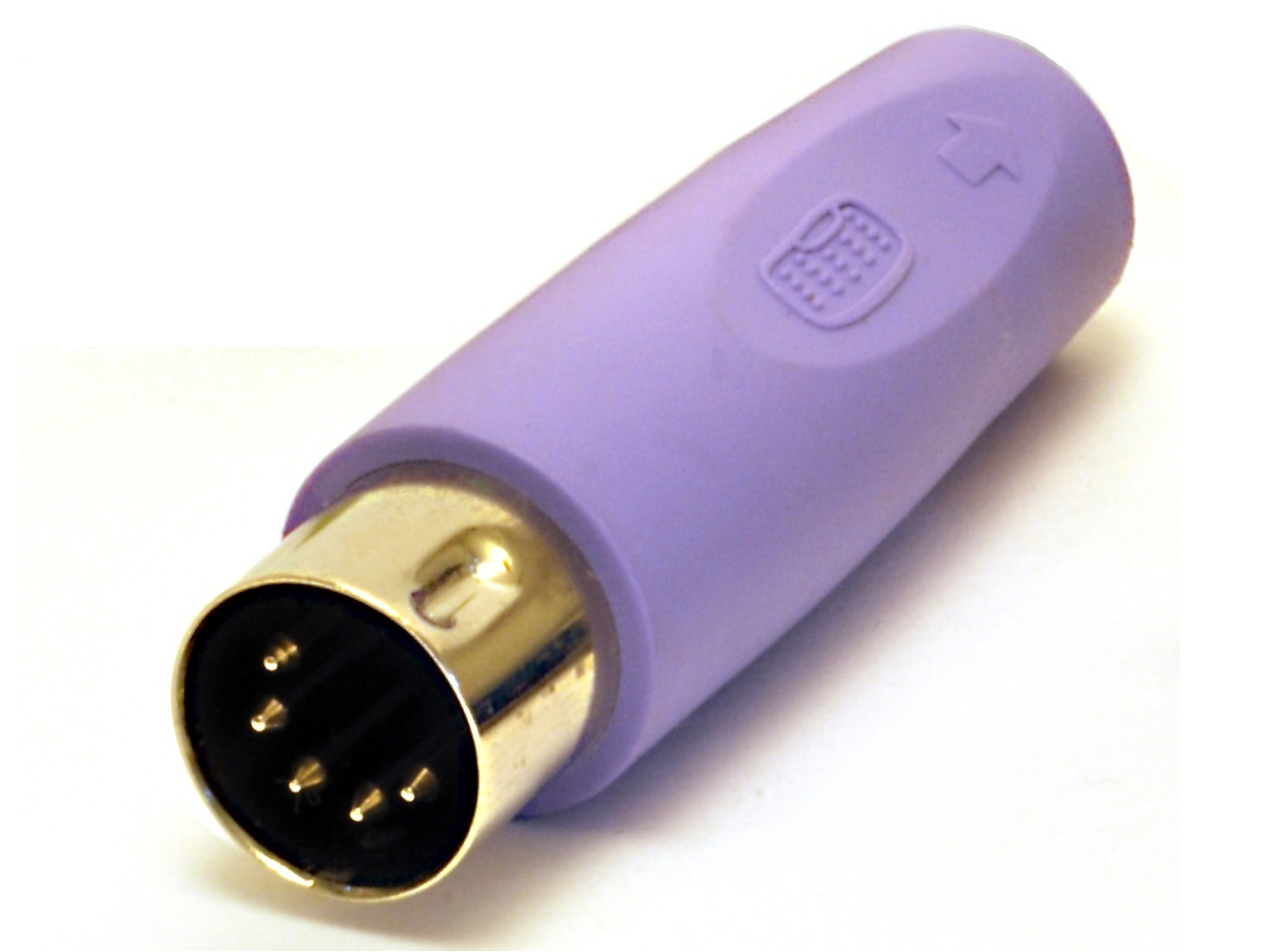
DIN Male to PS/2 Adapter

An adapter in regard to computing can be either a hardware component (device) or software that allows two or more incompatible devices to be linked together for the purpose of transmitting and receiving data. Given an input, an adapter alters it in order to provide a compatible connection between the components of a system. Both software and hardware adapters are used in many different devices such as mobile phones, personal computers, servers and telecommunications networks for a wide range of purposes. Some adapters are built into devices, while the others can be installed on a computer's motherboard or connected as external devices.

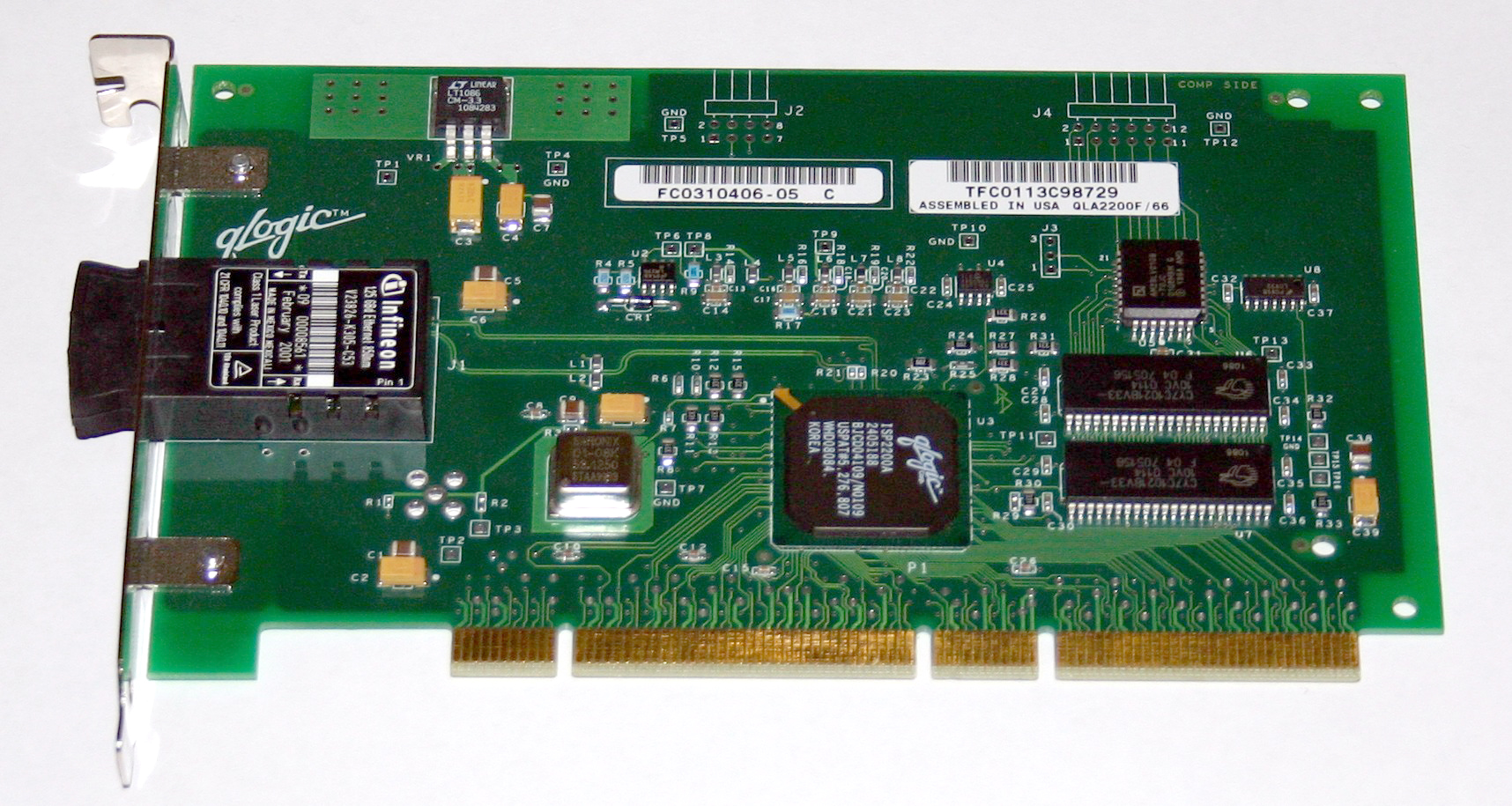
A Fibre Channel host bus adapter

A software component adapter is a type of software that is logically located between two software components and reconciles the differences between them.

== Function ==
=== Telecommunication ===
Like many industries, the telecommunication industry needs electrical devices such as adapters to transfer data across long distances. For example, analog telephone adapters (ATA) are used by telephone and cable companies. This device connects an analog telephone to a computer or network by connecting them to digital communication lines, which enables users to make a call via the Internet.

=== Personal computers ===
In modern personal computers, almost every peripheral device uses an adapter to communicate with a system bus, for example:

- Display adapters used to transmit signals to a display device
- Universal Serial Bus (USB) adapters for printers, keyboards and mice, among others
- Network adapters used to connect a computer to a network
- Host bus adapters used to connect hard disks or other storage

=== Analog and digital signals ===
Some hardware adapters convert between analog and digital signals with A/D or D/A converters. This allows adapters to interface with a broader range of devices. One common example of signal conversion is the sound card, which converts digital audio signals from a computer to analog signals for input to an amplifier.

== Types ==
=== Host adapter ===
A host adapter, host controller or host bus adapter (HBA) is a circuit board or device which allows peripheral devices (usually internal) to interface with a computer. Host bus adapters are used to connect hard drives, networks, and USB peripherals. They are commonly integrated into motherboards but can also take the form of an expansion card.

=== Adapter card ===
An adapter card or expansion card is a circuit board which is plugged into the expansion bus in a computer to add function or resources, in much the same way as a host bus adapter. Common adapter cards include video cards, network cards, sound cards, and other I/O cards.

=== Video adapter ===
A video adapter (also known as graphics adapter, display adapter, graphics card, or video card) is a type of expansion card for computers which converts data and generates the electrical signal to display text and graphics on a display device.

=== Bus master adapter ===
Bus master adapters fit in EISA or MCA expansion slots in computers, and use bus mastering to quickly transfer data by bypassing the CPU and interfacing directly with other devices.

=== General purpose interface adapter ===
A general purpose interface adapter or GPIA is usually used as an interface between a processing unit and a GPIB (IEEE 488) bus.

=== Fax adapter ===
A fax adapter, also called a fax card or fax board, is an internal fax modem which allows a computer to transmit and receive fax data.

=== Network adapter ===
Network adapters connect a device to a network and enable it to exchange data with other devices on the network. These devices may be computers, servers, or any other networking device.

Network adapter usually refers to a piece of computer hardware typically in the form of an Ethernet card, wireless network card, USB network adapter, or wireless game adapter. Hardware network adapters which are either wired or wireless can be installed on a motherboard, connecting the computer to a network.

The term can also refer to a virtual network adapter which exists only in software, either for the purposes of virtualization, or to interface with some other physical adapter.

=== Terminal adapter ===
In telecommunications, a terminal adapter or TA acts as an interface between a terminal device, such as a computer or telephone, and a communications network (typically an integrated services digital network).

=== Channel-to-channel adapter ===
A channel-to-channel adapter (CTCA) connects two input/output channels in IBM mainframes.

=== Resource adapters ===
Resource adapters are used to retrieve and route data. They provide access to databases, files, messaging systems, enterprise applications and other data sources and targets. Each adapter includes a set of adapter commands that can be used to customize its operation. Adapter commands specify different queues and queue managers, specific messages by message ID, specific sets of messages with the same message ID, message descriptors in the data, and more.

The resource adapters provided with many integration products enable data transformation and adapter-specific behavior recognition on different systems and data structures.

== See also ==
- Computer port (hardware)
- Controller (computing)
- Electrical connector
