= Board-to-board connector =

Board-to-board (BTB) connectors are used to connect printed circuit boards (PCB), electronic components that contain a conductive pattern printed on the surface of the insulating base in an accurate and repeatable manner.

== Overview ==
Each terminal on a BTB connector is connected to a PCB. A BTB connector includes housing and a specific number of terminals. The terminal is made from a conductive material (mostly copper alloy), and plated to improve conductivity and antirust. Terminals transmit the current/signal between PCBs connected by BTB; the housing is made of insulating material (mostly plastic).

== Classification ==
BTB connectors are divided up into four mounting types:

1. Through-hole technology
2. Surface-mount technology
3. Plug-in technology
4. Solderless stacking mezzanine technology

BTB connectors are selected by considering the mounting method, pin pitch, number of the rows (aka number of the ways), pin length, stacker height etc.

== See also ==
- Pin header
- Signal integrity
- Edge connector
