= Bent pin analysis =

Form of failure mode and effect analysis for electrical connectors and wiring

Bent pin analysis is a special kind of failure mode and effect analysis (FMEA) performed on electrical connectors, and by extension it can also be used for FMEA of interface wiring. This analysis is generally applicable to mission-critical and safety-critical systems and is particularly applicable to aircraft, where failures of low-tech items such as wiring can and sometimes do affect safety.

== How Connectors Work ==
Electrical connectors carry signals and power between parts of a system that may need to be separated during manufacturing, while in use, or when maintenance is required. Each connector that is part of a mating connector pair may be part of an electrical cable assembly (in which the unmated connector has some freedom of movement), or part of a chassis or other assembly (in which the connector position is fixed).

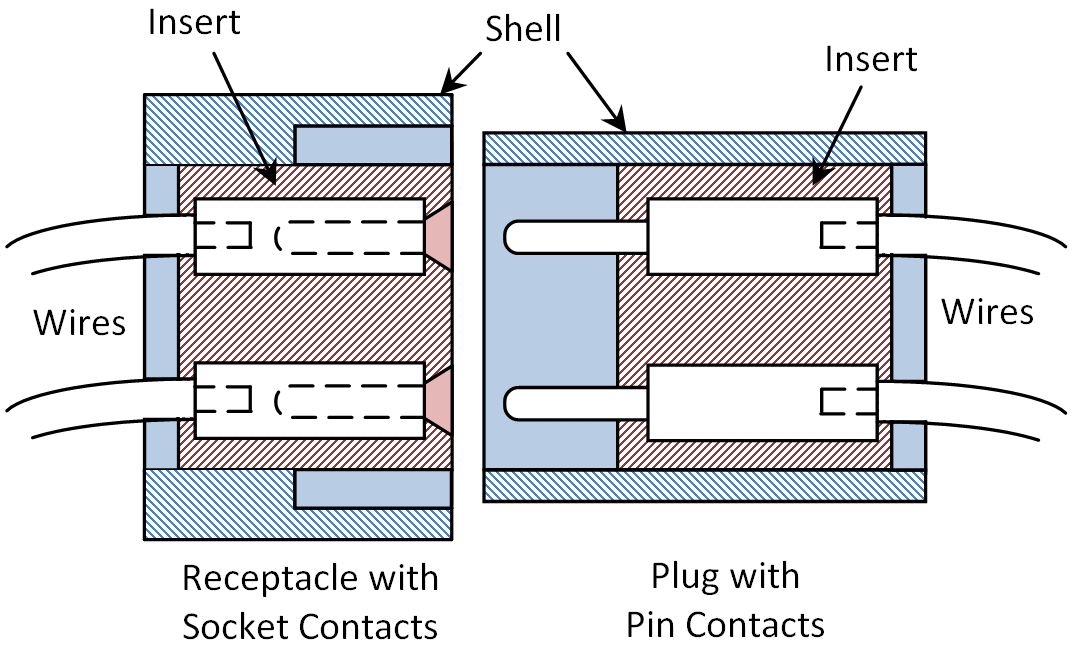
Figure 1 – Essential Connector Parts for Bent Pin Analysis

In most pairs of mating connectors, one connector is fitted with an array of socket contacts and the other connector has a corresponding array of pin (or other shaped) contacts, as illustrated in Figure 1. These are sometimes called female and male contacts. Contacts are held in fixed positions within the connector body by a solid rectangular or cylindrical block of insulating material called an insert (shaded red in the illustration). The insert includes holes to accommodate the contacts. In many modern connectors used to pass signals and power in wires, contacts are supplied separately from the connector body. The non-mating ends of the contacts are crimped or soldered to wires, and then the mating ends of the contacts are pushed into the connector inserts with a special tool. A properly inserted contact locks itself in the insert, and another special tool must be used to extract it. In some kinds of connectors the contacts are permanently captured in the insert, so it might be necessary to replace the entire connector if one contact becomes damaged.

Not all connectors are joined to wires as shown in the figure. For example, some connectors may be populated with contacts whose non-mating ends feature printed circuit (PC) tails rather than openings for wires so that the contacts may be joined directly to a printed wiring board.

Most connectors also include an outer metal jacket, called a shell (shaded blue in the illustration), which retains the insert in a fixed position with respect to the shell. A shell provides a means to handle the connector while providing the contacts with some protection against damage. Shells in a mating connector pair are designed to mate in exactly one orientation with respect to each other such that their inserts align the socket and pin contacts for mating without damage as the connectors are pushed together. Shells in most kinds of connectors also provide a mechanism to lock mating connectors together to prevent unintentional de-mating due to stress or vibration. Metal shells are often electrically connected to chassis ground for safety purposes and for control of electromagnetic interference (EMI).

A connector whose shell fits inside the shell of the mating connector is called a plug, and the other connector is called a receptacle. The figure shows a plug with pin contacts and a receptacle with socket contacts, but the opposite arrangement is also common.

== How Connectors Fail ==
Connectors, like any other system parts, are subject to failures. Metal shells can fail mechanically such that connector pairs fail to remain mated. Bent pin analysis examines more common connector failure modes associated with connector contacts. These include loss of electrical conductivity along an intended path due to corrosion on mating surfaces of electrical contacts, wires that have broken away from the contacts, and physically damaged or bent contacts. A bent contact cannot mate with the corresponding contact in the mating connector. These bent contacts are usually called bent pins. While some contacts are not truly pins with circular cross sections, any bendable male contact is typically called a pin.

In most connectors, and as shown in Figure 1, socket contacts are held completely within the insert, with just the mating end of the socket contact accessible at the insert mating surface. With this arrangement, socket contacts have good protection from unexpected damage during handling, and socket contacts with this arrangement are therefore not subject to inadvertent bending. In contrast, the mating ends of pin contacts protrude above the surface of the insert, and mishandling can bend one or more of these pins. For example, bending can occur if a person fails to carefully align the shells of two mating connectors before pushing them together because the shell of the socket connector can sometimes be pushed against exposed pins on the pin connector. Or, a person handling a cable assembly may let an end of the cable with a pin contact connector brush against the corner of a workbench, leaving some bent pins. While one or more pins may suffer only a slight bend due to mishandling, an attempt to mate the two halves can force a slightly bent pin – which no longer aligns with the opening of its socket contact – to slide between the mating surfaces of the two inserts and wind up lying flat between them. Unfortunately, pin contacts are thin and can easily be bent in many kinds of connectors, and the effect of this bending on mating usually isn't noticeable when a human applies the relatively strong force necessary to mate a connector pair. Rather, the damage becomes known only when the system fails to operate as expected.

(Some newer connectors are designed with the exact opposite arrangement – protruding socket contacts and recessed pin contacts. The idea is that the more vulnerable pins are protected and the more rigid sockets are exposed, and if a rigid socket is bent by mishandling the damage becomes immediately obvious because it is virtually impossible to mate the two connectors. Since the damaged connector cannot be mated, and presumably the system would not be operated, there is no reason to apply bent pin analysis for this kind of connector.)

The effects of a bent pin on system operation may or may not be immediately obvious, but they are potentially catastrophic. There are several possible failure modes. If a pin that normally carries a signal or power has bent, the electrical path is now broken. If the bent pin does not touch a neighboring pin or a grounded shell, then there are no shorts to other paths. Figure 2 shows how pin spacing and diameter in one common military-type connector are such that a bent pin can fall between two others without making contact.

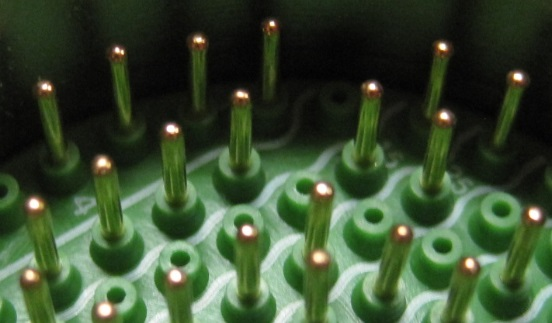
Figure 2 – Connector Pins with Pin Barriers

If the bent pin touches the grounded shell, then the pin's signal is now shorted to chassis ground. If the bent pin is touching another contact (or two other contacts), then there is an electrical short between two (or three) paths (Figure 3). In some very commonly used miniature D connectors, it is possible that a bent pin can touch two neighboring contacts plus a grounded connector shell, thus shorting chassis ground to three electrical paths. The connector in Figure 3 is an example: its mating plug connector (not shown) fits inside the Figure 3 receptacle shell, and the plug's shell is therefore closer to the pins than the receptacle shell. This means that the bent pin in the figure can touch a shell.

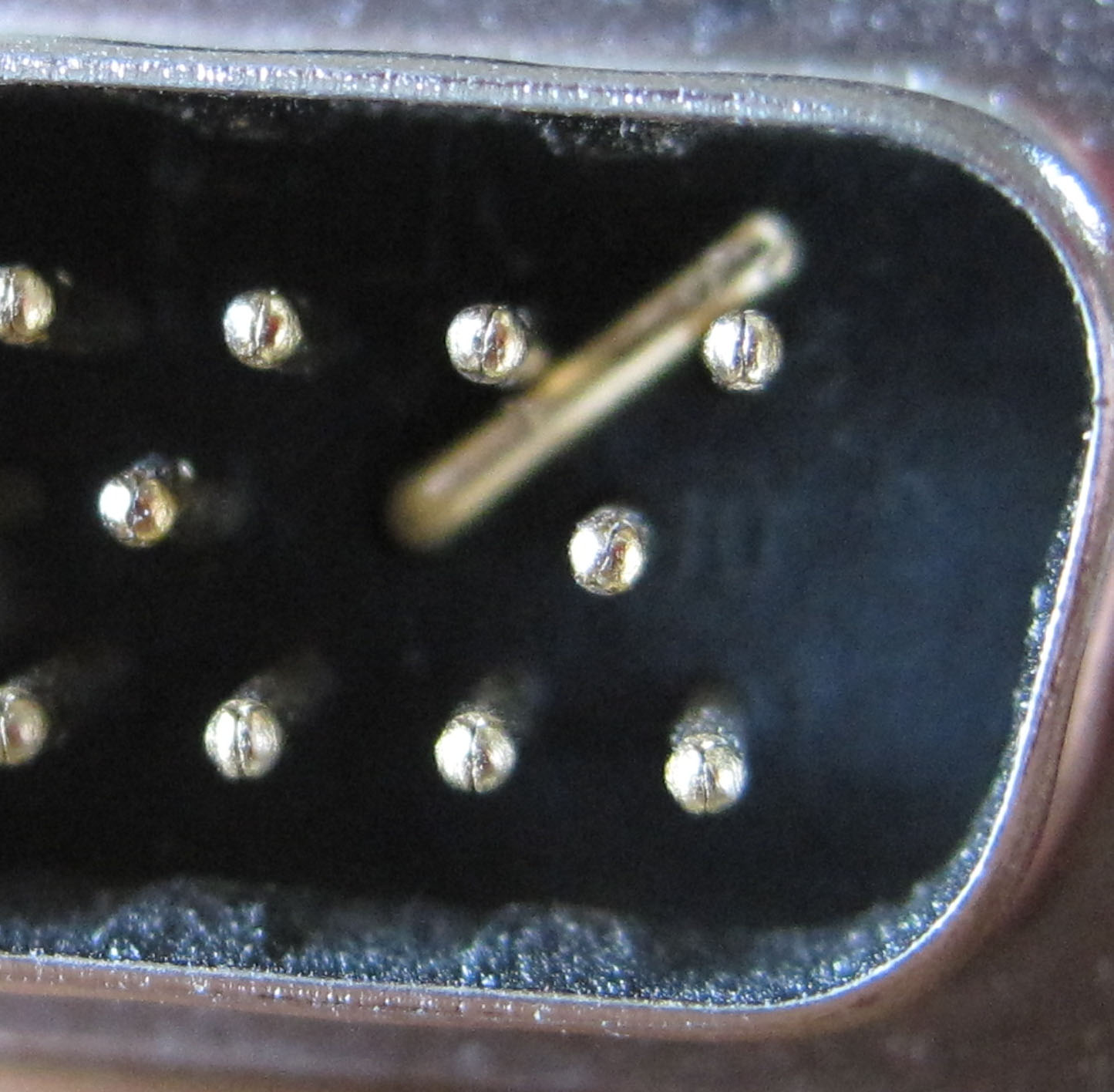
Figure 3 – Shorted Trio

=== Special Considerations in Bent Pin Analysis ===
As with any kind of FMEA, bent pin analysis considers only one failure mode at a time. A simple (and traditional) bent pin analysis looks at consequences of each pin bending to each of its neighbors and to the shell. However, as noted above, a bent pin can sometimes touch more than one electrical path at once, so a more complete analysis also considers multiple simultaneous failures caused by the singular failure mode of one bent pin.

Bent pin analysis also determines effects of unused pins that can bend. An unwired but bent “spare” pin may cause no noticeable effect at all, but it may also short two other paths together, or it may short a neighboring path to a grounded shell.

=== Non-Bending Failure Modes ===
Bent pin analysis also considers open paths between mating contacts. While an open path may be caused by a bent pin that doesn't touch any neighboring contact (depending on pin density, this is possible in some connectors and impossible in others), but an open path may also be caused by failure modes other than bending. As noted above, one common failure mode is corrosion of the mating surfaces of contacts, but corrosion may also affect the interface where the wire is joined to the contact. Another failure mode is an improperly seated contact (one that has not been properly locked into place in its insert during manufacturing, or one whereby the contact's locking mechanism fails), so that the contact is pushed out of the insert during the mating process, or it can "walk out" as result of pull from its attached wire. At some point in time, the improperly seated contact moves away from its mating contact and breaks the electrical path.

== Performing Bent Pin Analysis ==
As with any other FMEA, bent pin analysis consists of two parts: determining failure modes, and determining the consequences (failure effects) on system behavior.

=== Determining Failure Modes ===
The failure modes of a particular pin always include (a) open circuit due to corrosion or other non-bending failure, and at least one of the following if the pin is bendable: (b) bending to nothing, (c) bending to one neighboring pin, (d) bending to one neighboring pin and the shell, (e) bending two neighboring pins, (f) bending to two neighboring pins and the shell, and (g) bending to the shell.

In bent pin analysis, as it is usually performed, failure modes of each pin are determined using a scaled drawing of the connector and its pins. The analyst considers each bendable pin, one at a time, and determines which neighboring pins (if any) the selected pin can reach if bent, and whether the selected bent pin can reach the shell. The analysis usually does not include failure modes in which a bent pin simultaneously touches more than one other pin or a pin and the shell. If the analysis requires failure rates, an approximation is usually made by assigning an average failure rate to each failure mode based on the overall connector failure rate and the number of pins.

Since this approach relies on human judgment there can be errors in the conclusions. Even with a conservative approach to cover "worst case" outcomes of bending, concluding that a bent pin can reach another pin (or the shell) when that failure mode is physically impossible is just as much an error as concluding that a bent pin cannot reach another pin (or the shell) when that failure mode is in fact possible.

A more mathematical approach can be applied to determine bending failure modes and the failure rate of each. The approach is to compute the maximum reach of a bent pin as a radius from the pin's center in the insert, then to compute the distance from the bent pin's center to the closest part of each neighboring pin (and the shell). If the bent pin's radius can reach a neighboring pin (or the shell), then the probability of contact with that item can be computed given that the pin is bent. Probability is computed from items 1, 2, and 3 in the following list. Failure rate is computed from the probability and items 4 and 5.

1. Shell and pin dimensional data from military or manufacturer's drawings.

2. The ratio of open path failures to shorting failures from published data (e.g., FMD-97).

3. Ground rules listed in the following section.

4. Connector failure rate (specifically for the pin connector of the mating connector pair) from published data (e.g. MIL-HDBK-217.)

5. Exposure time (the period for which the failure rate is computed).

Even with mathematical analysis, however, results can be subjective, particularly since determining the reach of a bent pin requires some engineering judgment. Nothing specifies the characteristics of a bend or its location along the mating surface of the insert. Some connectors also include a thin soft rubber seal (called “mating seal with pin barriers”) on the insert's mating surface to minimize moisture flow from the rear of the insert to the contact mating surfaces (Figure 2 is an example), and this seal adds some unpredictability to the pin's bend radius and location.

Engineering judgment is also sometimes required to determine dimensions of the inside shell surface of a connector. For example, a common miniature D socket connector, which always fits inside a pin connector (Figure 3 is an example) when mated, is the closest shell surface to the pins. The dimensions of this inside surface determine whether a bent pin can reach a grounded shell, and the likelihood of that event, but these dimensions are not always published. It would be necessary to derive them by considering published outside dimensions and the shell material thickness, or by making actual measurements.

Additionally, since published drawings usually include minimum and maximum values for each dimension, engineering judgment is required select one appropriate value from the given range of values for each dimension needed in the analysis.

These kinds of subjectivity are relevant only in connectors where it is not clearly obvious that each bent pin will or will not make contact with each neighboring item.

=== Ground Rules for Mathematical Analysis ===
A mathematical approach requires ground rules for handling input data for each pin in a uniform way.

1. A pin is designated as either bendable or not bendable.

2. All pins are equally likely to fail in the same way.

3. A pin, if inadvertently bent, is equally likely to bend in any direction.

4. A bent pin that has been pushed flat against the mating surface of its insert may be slightly curved.

5. An unwired bent pin that can touch two or more electrical paths simultaneously has open and shorted failure modes.

Ground Rule 1 means that a pin can be bent to lie on the mating surface of its insert, or it does not bend at all. Certain pins that are thick (have large cross-sections) and certain kinds of contacts may be designated as non-bendable, although some organizations require that every pin must be considered bendable. However, a pin designated as unbendable is still part of the analysis because other pins may bend to it, resulting in the bent pin's shorting to the unbendable pin's path. An unbendable pin may also fail due to corrosion.

Ground Rule 2 means each pin is equally likely to bend, each pin is equally likely to cause an open path due to surface corrosion, etc.

Ground Rule 3 applies to pins with symmetrical cross sections (i.e., circular or square). In contrast, blade contacts that are sometimes used in high-density circuit board edge connectors have cross sections that are thicker in one dimension and thinner in the other. Blade contacts may be considered equally likely to bend in either direction of their narrow dimension.

Ground Rule 4 accounts for the fact that a pin may curve as the mating surfaces force it to bend 90 degrees from its normal direction. This means that a bent pin might touch a pin whose line of sight is blocked by a third pin standing between them, or that a bent pin might simultaneously touch two neighboring pins whose separation is greater than the bent pin's diameter. The characteristics of such bending are subjective.

Ground Rule 5 means that an unwired “spare” pin that can cause system effects when bent (for example, if it can short two neighboring paths together, or if it can short a neighboring path to a grounded shell) must be analyzed like a non-spare pin. It will have both open and shorted failure modes, although the consequence of an open circuit (without shorting to anything) is “no effect,” and the consequence of shorting to other pin(s) or to the shell without system effects is also “no effect.”

With these ground rules and the information cited in the previous section, each possible failure mode and its associated failure rate can be computed such that the sum of the failure rates of each failure mode equals the failure rate of connector assembly (for contact failures). A list of each possible failure modes is the basis for the next part of the analysis: determining the effects of each failure mode.

=== Determining Failure Effects ===
As with FMEA in general, there are typically three levels of failure effects for each failure mode: local or low level, mid-level, and system or end level. For bent pin analysis, local level failure effect descriptions can be precisely stated in terms of the bent pin's signal role (e.g., "input" or "output"), signal name, action (e.g., "shorts"), and affected signal path (e.g., "xyz normal path"). This means that low level failure effect descriptions can be composed without considering any other parts of the system. Since this text is independent of other system activities, local level failure effect descriptions can also be generated by software. Mid- and system level effects usually require investigation of other system parts.

For example, a failure mode might be listed on the FMEA worksheet as “Pin A shorts Pin K,” and the corresponding local level failure effect might be “Input Signal X shorts Signal Y normal path.” (Here, bent Pin A carries Signal X and undamaged Pin K carries Signal Y.) Note that the failure mode “Pin A shorts Pin K” is very different from “Pin K shorts Pin A,” and the failure effects in general would also be very different.

=== Signal Roles ===
When determining consequences of a bent pin that shorts to another electrical path, it is important to consider whether the bent pin is connected to the source of the signal or power, rather than connected to the destination or load. In the former case, the bent pin connects its signal or power to a neighboring path; in the latter case, the signal or power of the normal path feeds the destination or load of the broken path. Consequences of these two cases are, in general, vastly different. For example, a bent pin may be part of a path labeled "+5VDC," but if the pin is connected to the load end of the path, then it would be an error to assume that the pin will put 5 volts on whatever it touches. To prevent this kind of error during analysis, it is useful to identify each signal's role on each pin. In the example of the previous paragraph, the signal role was “input,” and this meant the bent pin was connected to the load or destination. If the cited role were “output,” that would mean that the bent pin was connected to the source of the signal or power. The list of useful roles to aid the analysis might include input, output, bidirectional, power, ground, spare, and shell.

=== Other Considerations ===
Grounds. The role “ground” may be ambiguous in systems that isolate different kinds of grounds (typical isolated grounds are analog signal ground, digital signal ground, AC power ground, DC power ground, and chassis ground). If different kinds of ground paths are in separate paths in a connector, the analysis should treat them as separate signals. Also, paths that connect shields associated with twisted pairs and coaxial paths should be treated as separate signals even though they are all "ground" paths because a disconnected shield may affect the associated twisted pair or coax path.

Redundant Paths. Two paths with the same name aren't necessarily redundant. Multiple paths can be considered redundant only if (1) loss of one path doesn't cause the remaining path(s) to have an unsafe current load, excessive voltage drop, or excessive impedance, and (2) the paths are both connected at each end. For example, multiple paths with the same name may originate from the same source but if the paths terminate at separate loads then a bent pin may cause one load to see an open circuit.

Equivalent Effects. In many analyses, there are multiple signals whose failure effects are identical for identical failure modes. For example, in a connector carrying paths of 32 data bits of equal importance, the mid- and system level effects of any one open path are identical to the mid- and system level effects of any other open path. The implication is that the analysis must determine the mid-level and system level effects for only the first occurrence of an open data bit path on the worksheet. The remaining 31 open path effect descriptions can be made identical to the first by setting each to the corresponding values of the first. That way, a correction is made in only the first line where the failure mode appears on the worksheet, and the others will be corrected automatically.

=== A Bent Pins FMEA Worksheet ===
Figure 4 is a simplified sample of a typical FMEA worksheet for bent pin analysis. Additional columns of information may be added as shown in the separate article on FMEA. This sample is based on a format generated by a bent pin analysis software package and using data for a 79-pin connector. (Some columns of information have been removed from the original format to limit the table size for this article.) Information shown in the figure is derived from connector-related information as described above. Mid- and System ("Hi") level effect descriptions are not shown but would be supplied by human analysts. In cell A2 of this sample, “P5-1@” means that Pin 1 of connector P5 has opened a path due to causes other than bending. In cell A3, “P5-1” means that the Pin 1 path has been opened due to bending (but not touching anything else). While the effects of these two failure modes are the same, they are listed separately on the worksheet because their failure rates are different and reflect the fact that open path failures are far more likely than shorted path (bend-related) failures. The failure rates in column G are per million hours and the sum of all failure rates equals the connector failure rate. (The individual failure rates are derived from the connector failure rate.)

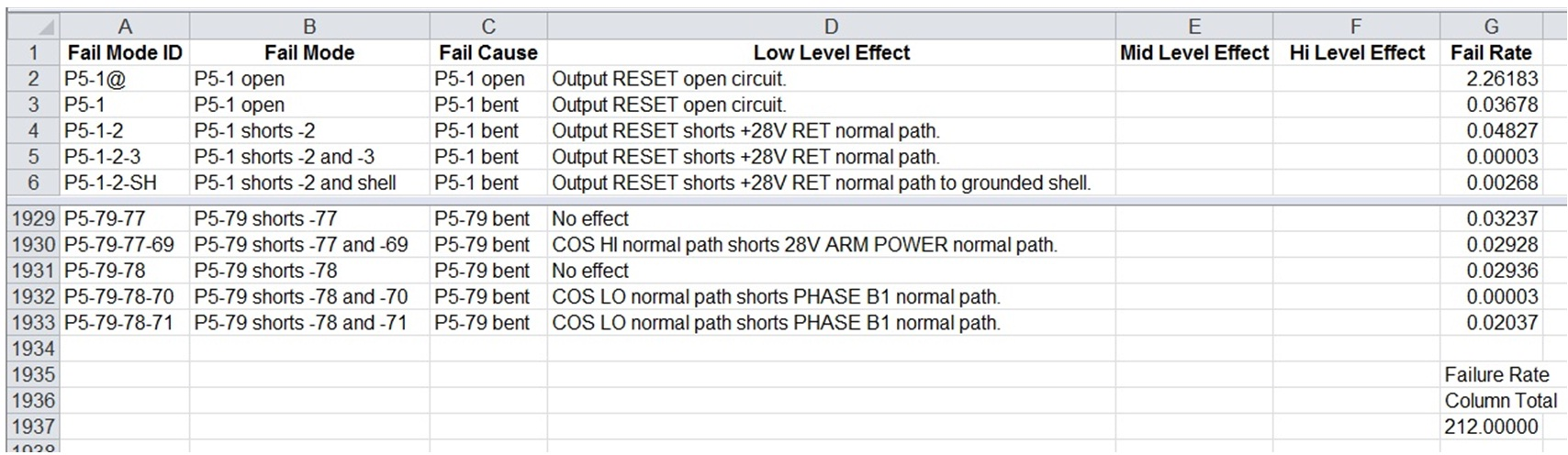
Figure 4 – Typical Bent Pin Analysis Worksheet

== Extensions to Bent Pin Analysis ==
Variations of bent pin analysis include FMEA of wiring rather than connectors. Cable Matrix Analysis is one variation that is used to determine effects of shorts in electrical cables between each conductor and its neighbors due to failure of wire insulation, given the ground rule that no paths are broken when such shorts occur. Cable matrix analysis may also include effects of non-shorting but open paths, and shorts between wires and chassis ground caused by failure of wire insulation.
