= Edge connector =

Connector type for printed circuit boards

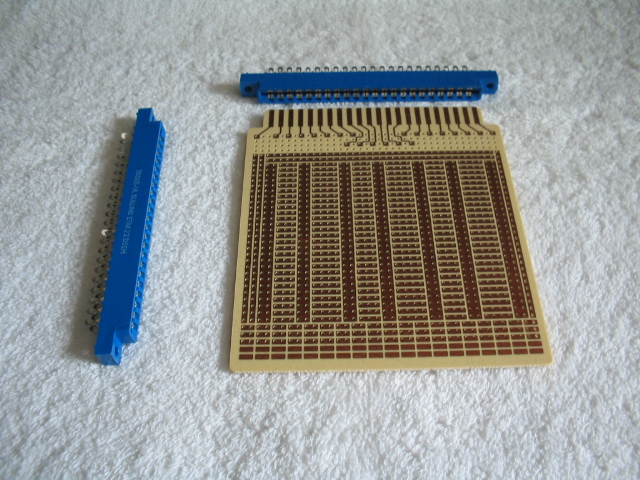
Two 44-pin edge connector sockets (blue objects) and matching circuit board. The Edge connector is 3.5 in (89 mm) long, with 22 contacts on each side

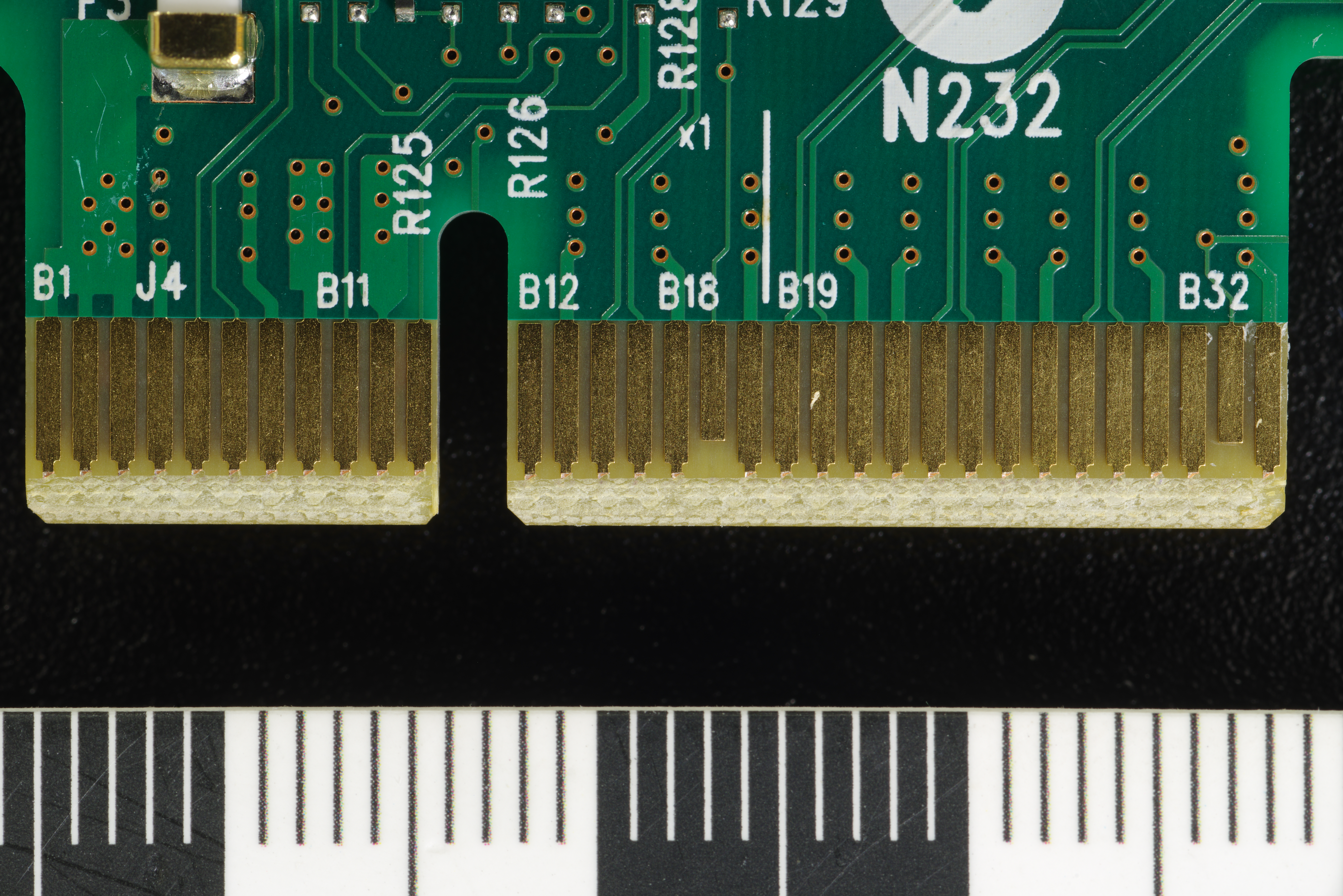
Edge connector for PCIe x4

An edge connector is the portion of a printed circuit board (PCB) consisting of traces leading to the edge of the board that are intended to plug into a matching socket. The edge connector is a money-saving device because it only requires a single discrete female connector (the male connector is formed out of the edge of the PCB), and they also tend to be fairly robust and durable. They are commonly used in computers for expansion slots for peripheral cards, such as PCI, PCI Express, and AGP cards.

== Socket design ==
Edge connector sockets consist of a plastic "box" open on one side, with pins on one or both sides of the longer edges, sprung to push into the middle of the open center. Connectors are often keyed to ensure the correct polarity, and may contain bumps or notches both for polarity and to ensure that the wrong type of device is not inserted. The socket's width is chosen to fit to the thickness of the connecting PCB.

The opposite side of the socket is often an insulation-piercing connector which is clamped onto a ribbon cable. Alternatively, the other side may be soldered to a motherboard or daughtercard.

== Uses ==
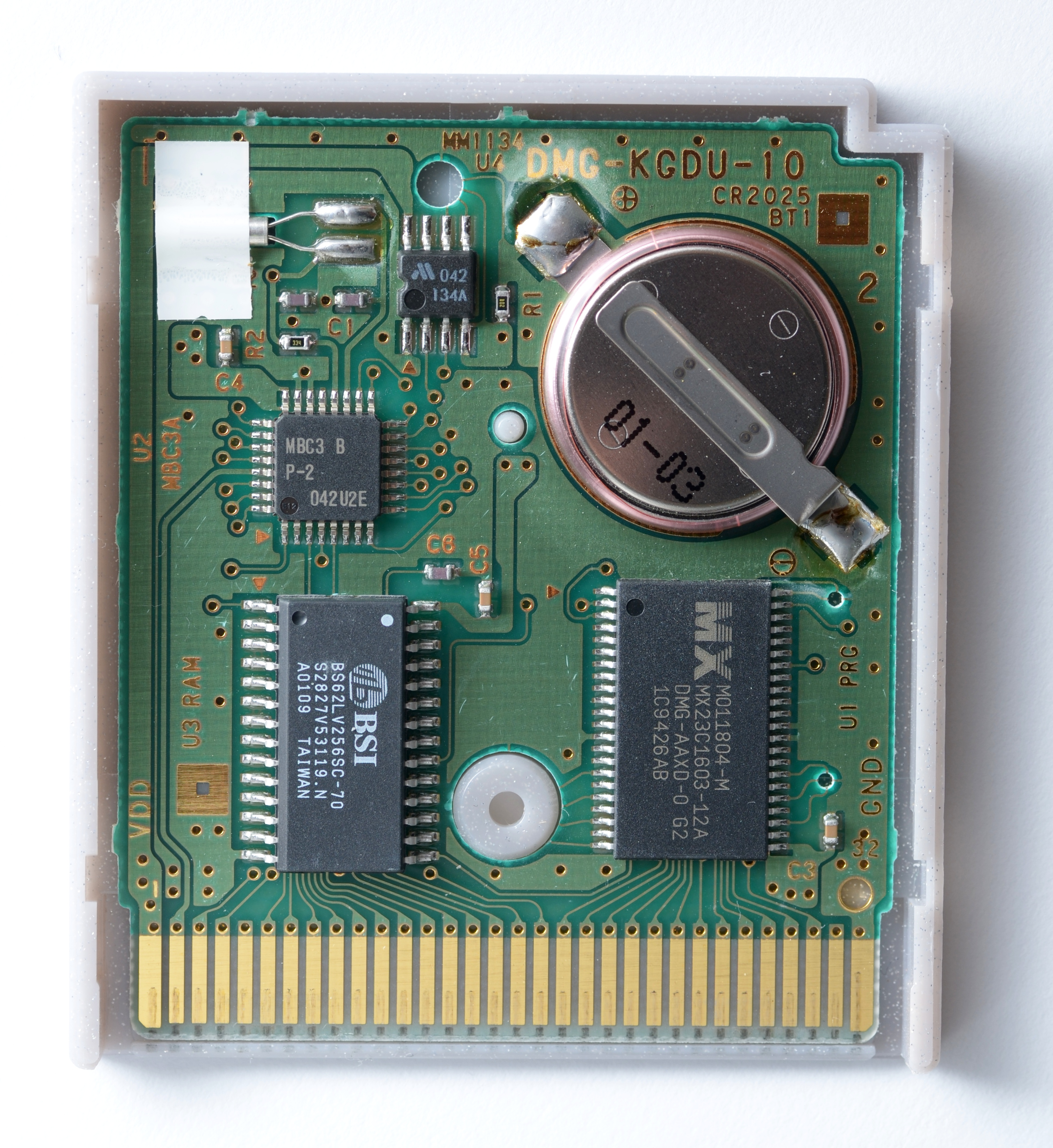
An opened Game Boy cartridge with edge connector on bottom

Edge connectors are commonly used in personal computers for connecting expansion cards and computer memory to the system bus. Example expansion peripheral technologies which use edge connectors include PCI, PCI Express, and AGP. Slot 1 and Slot A also used edge connectors; the processor being mounted on a card with an edge connector, instead of directly to the motherboard as before and since.

IBM PCs used edge connector sockets attached to ribbon cables to connect 5.25" floppy disk drives. 3.5" drives use a pin connector instead.

Video game cartridges typically take the form of a PCB with an edge connector: the socket is located within the console itself. The Nintendo Entertainment System was unusual in that it was designed to use a zero insertion force edge connector: instead of the user forcing the cartridge into the socket directly, the cartridge was first placed in a bay and then mechanically lowered into position.

Starting with the Amiga 1000 in 1985, various Amiga models used the 86-pin Zorro I edge connector, which was later reshaped into the internal 100-pin Zorro II slot on the Amiga 2000 and later upmarket models.

== See also ==
- Pin header connector
- Insulation-displacement connector
