= Partial element equivalent circuit =

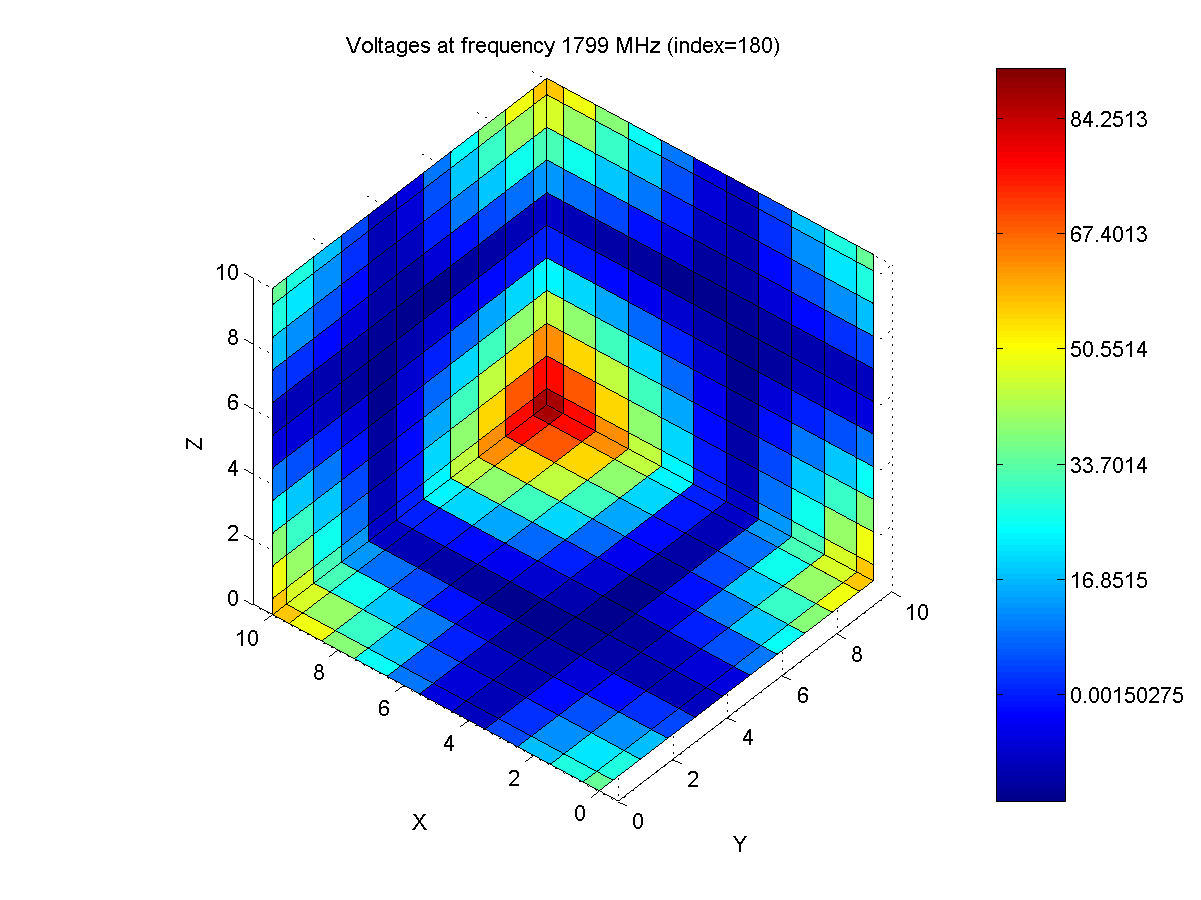
A 10x10x10 cm cube is modelled in the frequency domain. The cube is excited with a unitary current pulse in one corner.

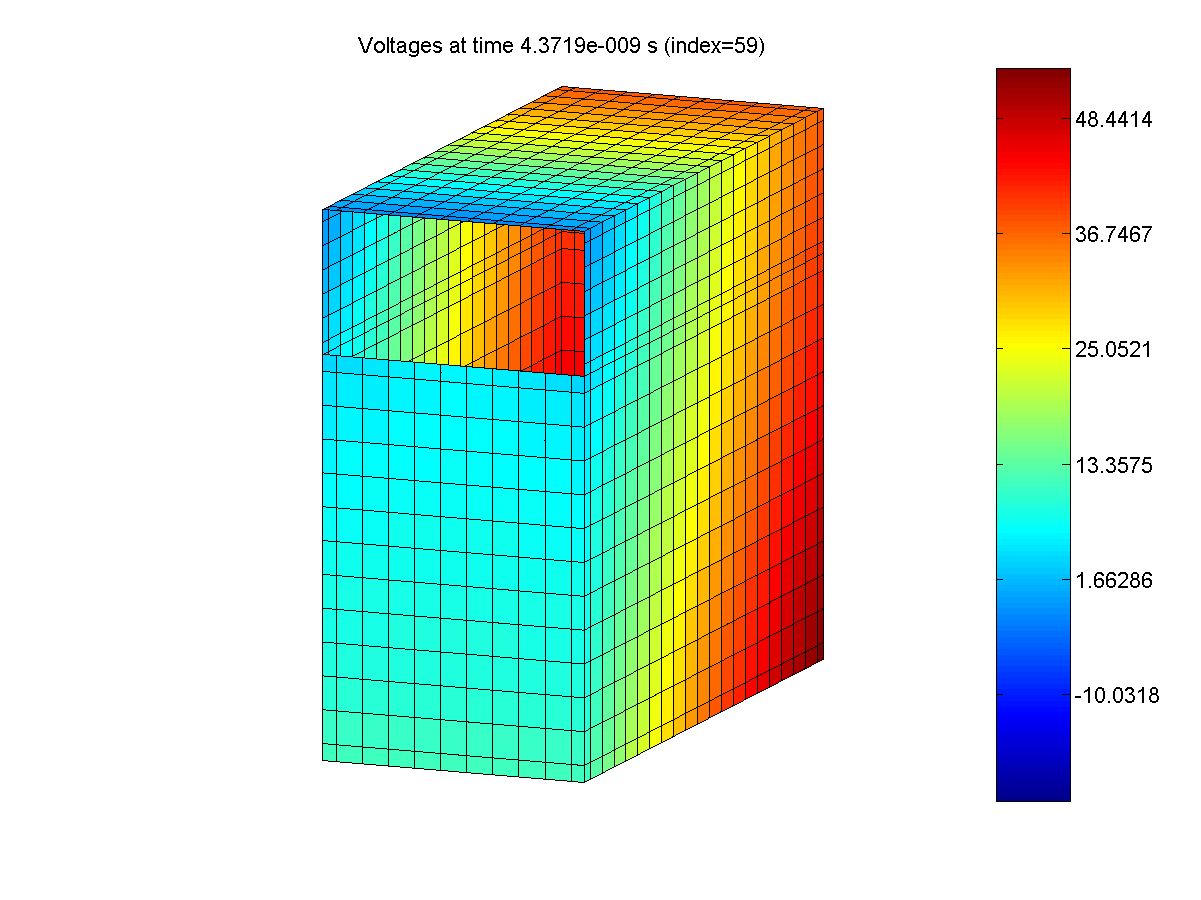
A 19x43x38 cm (LxWxT) case with one opening (19x10) in the front is modeled in the time domain.

Partial element equivalent circuit method (PEEC) is partial inductance calculation used for interconnect problems from early 1970s which is used for numerical modeling of electromagnetic (EM) properties. The transition from a design tool to the full-wave method involves the capacitance representation, the inclusion of time retardation and the dielectric formulation. Using the PEEC method, the problem will be transferred from the electromagnetic domain to the circuit domain where conventional SPICE-like circuit solvers can be employed to analyze the equivalent circuit. By having the PEEC model one can easily include any electrical component e.g. passive components, sources, non-linear elements, ground, etc. to the model. Moreover, using the PEEC circuit, it is easy to exclude capacitive, inductive or resistive effects from the model when it is possible, in order to make the model smaller. As an example, in many applications within power electronics, the magnetic field is a dominating factor over the electric field due to the high current in the systems. Therefore, the model can be simplified by just neglecting capacitive couplings in the model which can simply be done by excluding the capacitors from the PEEC model.

Numerical modeling of electromagnetic properties are used by, for example, the electronics industry to:

- Ensure functionality of electric systems
- Ensure compliance with electromagnetic compatibility (EMC)

== History ==
The main research activity in this area has been and are performed, by Albert Ruehli at IBM Thomas J. Watson Research Center, starting with a publication in 1972. At that time the foundation of the PEEC method was presented, i.e. the calculation of the partial inductances. The PEEC method was extended to more generalized problems, including dielectric material and retardation effect.

The PEEC method is not one of the most common techniques used in EM simulation software or as a research area but it has just been starting to gain recognition and for the first time there is a session at the 2001 IEEE EMC Symposium named after the technique. In the mid-1990s, two researchers from the University of L'Aquila in Italy, Professor Antonio Orlandi and Professor Giulio Antonini, published their first PEEC paper and are now together with Dr. Ruehli considered the top researchers in the area. Starting year 2006, several research projects have been initiated by the faculty of Computer Science and Electrical Engineering of Luleå University of Technology in Sweden in the focus area of PEEC with the emphasis on computer-based solvers for PEEC.

== Application ==
PEEC is widely used for combined electromagnetic and circuit problems in various areas such as power electronics, antenna design, signal integrity analysis, etc. Using PEEC the designed model of a physical structure is transferred from the electromagnetic domain into the circuit domain. Therefore, external electrical components and circuits can be connected to the equivalent circuit which consists of extracted partial elements, in a straightforward manner. Moreover, since the final model consists of circuit elements, various components can easily be excluded from the circuit to simplify the problem while the accuracy is still ensured. For instance, for low-frequency problems, one can safely remove capacitive couplings without degrading the accuracy of the results and hence reduce the problem size and complexity.

== Theory ==
The classical PEEC method is derived from the equation for the total electric field at a point written as

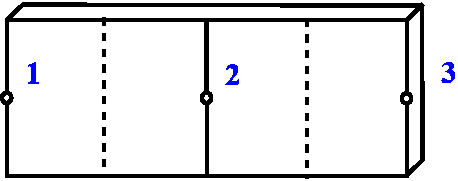
An orthogonal metal strip with 3 nodes and 2 cells.

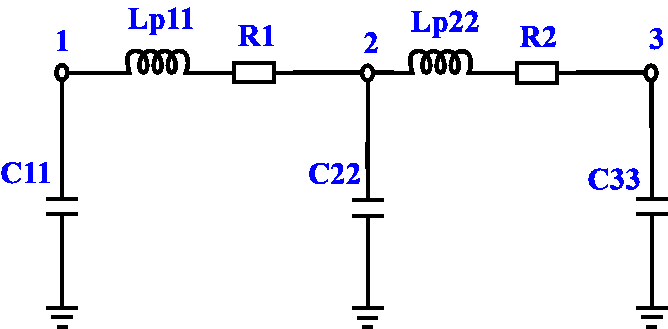
The corresponding PEEC circuit.

$$\vec{E}^i(\vec{r},t)  =   \frac{\vec{J}(\vec{r},t)}{\sigma} + \frac {\partial
\vec{A}(\vec{r},t)}{\partial t} + \nabla \phi (\vec{r},t)$$

where $\vec{E}^i$ is an incident electric field, $\vec{J}$ is a current density, $\vec{A}$ is the magnetic vector potential, $\phi$ is the scalar electric potential, and $\sigma$ the electrical conductivity all at observation point $\vec{r}$. In the figures on the right, an orthogonal metal strip with 3 nodes and 2 cells, and the corresponding PEEC circuit are shown.

By using the definitions of the scalar and vector potentials, the current- and charge-densities are discretized by defining pulse basis functions for the conductors and dielectric materials. Pulse functions are also used for the weighting functions resulting in a Galerkin type solution. By defining a suitable inner product, a weighted volume integral over the cells, the field equation can be interpreted as Kirchhoff's voltage law over a PEEC cell consisting of partial self inductances between the nodes and partial mutual inductances representing the magnetic field coupling in the equivalent circuit. The partial inductances are defined as

$$L_{p_{\alpha \beta}} = \frac {\mu}{4 \pi}\frac{1}{a_{\alpha}
a_{\beta}} \int_{v_{\alpha}} \int_{v_{\beta}} \frac {1} {|
\vec{r}_{\alpha} - \vec{r}_{\beta}|} d v_{\alpha} dv_{\beta}$$

for volume cell $\alpha$ and $\beta$. Then, the coefficients of potentials are computed as

$$P_{ij} = \frac{1}{S_i S_j} \frac{1}{4 \pi \epsilon_0} \int_{S_i}
\int_{S_j} \frac{1}{|\vec{r}_i - \vec{r}_j|} \; dS_j \; dS_i$$

and a resistive term between the nodes, defined as

$$R_\gamma = \frac{l_\gamma}{a_\gamma \sigma_\gamma}.$$

=== PEEC model reduction ===
The rigorous full-wave version of the PEEC method is called (Lp,P,R,t) PEEC, where Lp is partial inductance, P is the Maxwell potential coefficient (inverse of capacitance), R is resistance, and t is the time-delay. If available, a reduced model of the full-wave version can be used. For example, if the EIP structure is electrically small, the delay term t can be omitted and the model can be reduced to (Lp,P,R) PEEC model. In addition, if the angular frequency w is sufficiently high so that w*Lp >> R, we can omit R term and use approximate (Lp,P) PEEC model. According to various modeling situations, (Lp) and (Lp,R) models are also useful.

Model Order Reduction (MOR) has become an active research topic for circuit models in general and PEEC models in particular. Integration of a PEEC model directly into a circuit simulator is computationally expensive for two main facts. One is that a large number of circuit elements are generated for complex structures at high frequencies, and the other is that the circuit matrices based on modified nodal analysis (MNA) are usually dense due to full inductive and capacitive coupling. In order to model/simulate such problems efficiently, developing compact model representation via model order reduction is desirable for PEEC modeling.
