= Test point =

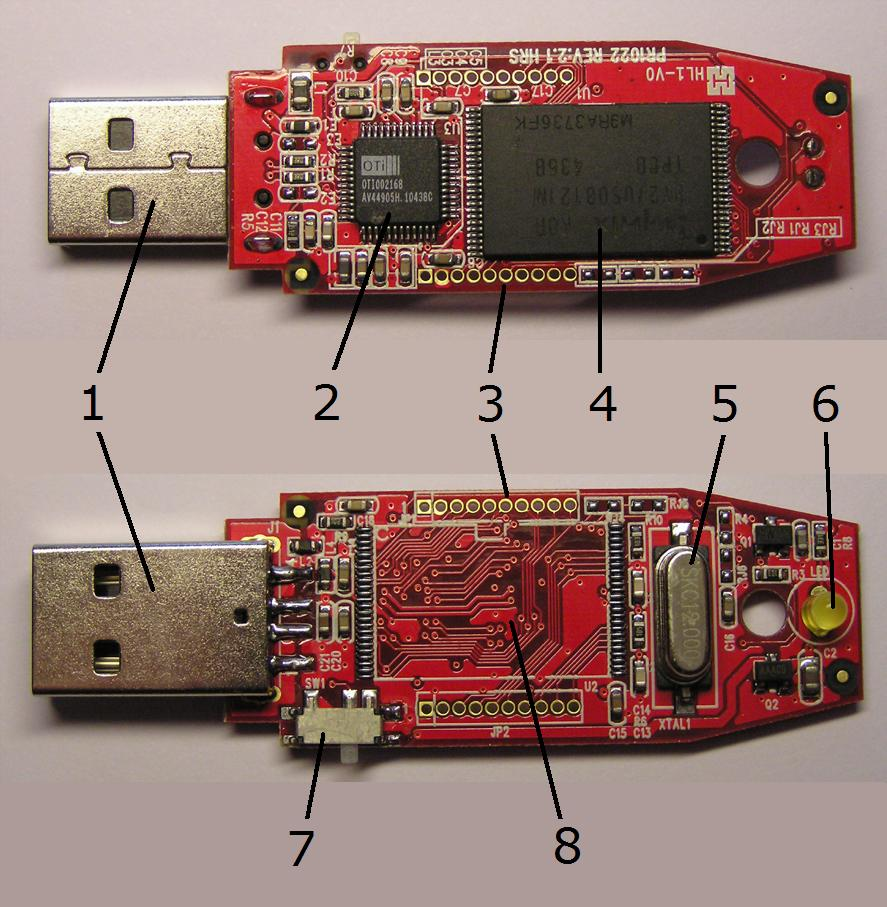
Manufacturing test access on a USB flash drive: the two rows of holes are marked 3.

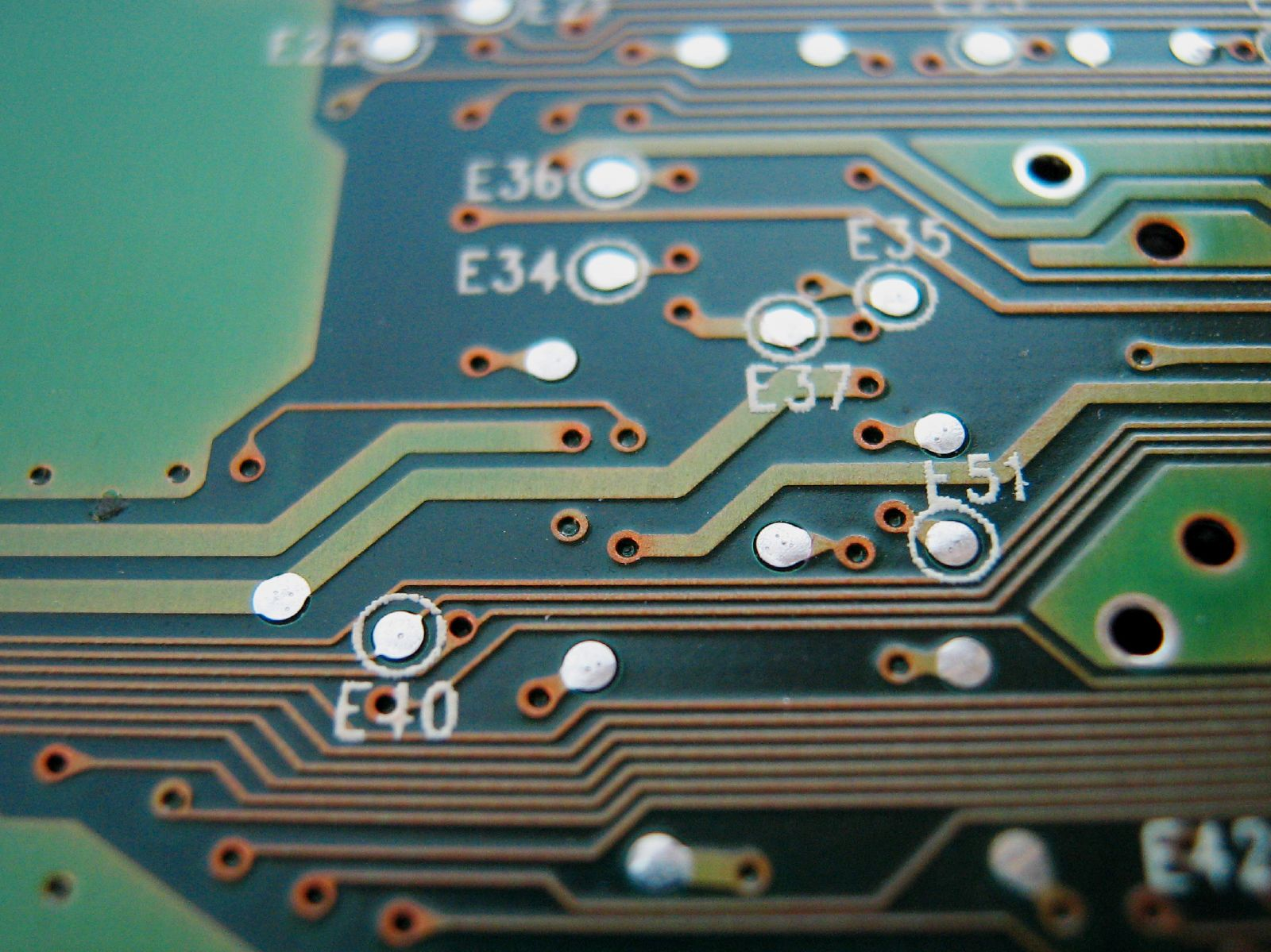
Test points E34, E35 and E36 on a printed circuit board, beside vias with teardrop connections.

A test point is a location within an electronic circuit that is used to monitor the state of the circuitry or inject test signals. On a printed circuit board (PCB), it may take the form of an exposed conductive pad, a via or a terminal intended for a probe or clip.

Test points serve three main purposes: evaluating a design during development, checking equipment during manufacture, and supporting later diagnosis and repair. They can also provide access for calibration. Their placement is part of design for testing, which considers both access for the test equipment and the effects of the test connections on the circuit.

== Uses ==
=== Development ===
During development, test points give engineers access to a prototype for checking its behavior, validating the design and evaluating component choices. An oscilloscope or logic analyzer can observe waveforms and bus activity through these connections. Measuring the voltage drop between test points on either side of a current-sense resistor gives the current through it; the supply voltage then allows power consumption to be calculated.

Test connections can also expose configuration and control signals, allowing a circuit to be placed in a particular operating state during debugging. Connections to a programming or debugging interface, such as JTAG, may use a conventional header or an array of pads contacted by spring-loaded pins. The latter provides temporary access without fitting a permanent connector to every board.

Not every test point on a prototype is retained in the production design. Connections used only during development may be removed if they are not needed for manufacturing tests or field servicing.

=== Manufacturing ===
Before components are fitted, bare-board testing checks continuity along intended connections and isolation between separate connections. Component pads and exposed vias are available to the probes at this stage. After assembly, some of these contacts lie beneath components and can no longer be reached, so other contacts or dedicated test pads are needed.

On assembled boards, in-circuit testing uses test points to apply electrical stimuli and measure the responses. Measurements of resistance, capacitance and voltage help detect open connections, shorts and incorrect component values. The results help identify boards for rejection or repair at a rework station.

A bed-of-nails fixture holds the board securely against a fixed array of spring-loaded probes. These contact the test points together and connect them to the tester. The probe positions match a particular board layout, so a board revision may require changes to the fixture.

Flying probe equipment moves its probes between programmed locations. It requires no dedicated bed-of-nails fixture and, where access permits, can contact component terminals as well as test pads. Systems equipped for additional operations can also perform functional tests, device programming and calibration.

=== Servicing and calibration ===
Test points remain useful after equipment enters service. Measurements at documented locations can be compared with specified voltages or signal conditions to locate a fault. Following repairs or component replacement, some equipment requires its calibration to be checked or adjusted; test points provide access for these measurements.

Measurements at supply rails and reset or enable lines help distinguish a missing supply from a circuit that has power but is being held inactive. In analog circuits, test points at sensor outputs and voltage references help localize a fault to a particular stage.

== Physical forms ==
PCB copper can form a test contact without an additional component. A pad connects the probe to the selected circuit node; a via may also bring a connection from an internal layer to the board surface. Existing pads and vias can be assigned as test points, as well as features added specifically for testing. For ordinary probing, the contact surface must remain exposed. A via covered by solder mask, known as a tented via, does not provide that access.

Pins and wire loops provide attachment points for probe hooks, spring clips and alligator clips. These components are available in through-hole and surface-mount forms, sometimes with colored insulating supports for identification. A clip can remain attached while the circuit is operating.

Test connections may carry printed labels or be grouped in a connector. Compact surface-mount assemblies can instead use rows of exposed pads, including tinned pads, without individual labels. Such pads provide contact surfaces for a test fixture without requiring separate terminals on the board.

== Layout and accessibility ==
Reliable contact depends on pad size, probe geometry and the positioning tolerances of the board and fixture. Clearance is needed around each contact for the probe and its supporting hardware. Nearby components and board edges can restrict access even when the pad itself is large enough.

Access from one side of the PCB generally allows a simpler fixture than probing both sides. PCB design software can distinguish test points used before assembly from those needed on the populated board, so each set can be checked against its own access requirements.

Fixture probes also apply mechanical loads. With many spring probes engaged at once, the total load can bend the board. Their distribution and the board's support affect the risk of damage during testing.

Where component density leaves too little room for physical access, boundary scan can supplement probing. Supported devices use a test access port to control and observe digital interconnections, reducing the need for a separate probe on each tested node. Boundary scan can be combined with in-circuit and functional tests to extend coverage.

== Electrical effects ==
Test-point geometry forms part of the circuit and can affect signal integrity. A branch trace leading to a test pad can act as a stub, producing reflections on the signal line. Keeping the contact close to the main signal path limits this effect. High-speed and high-frequency measurements may require test structures with controlled impedance.

A connected probe adds its own load. An oscilloscope probe has finite input resistance and capacitance, and therefore draws current from the circuit being measured. As frequency rises, the capacitive loading increases; it can slow signal edges and alter the waveform at the test point. The displayed waveform may therefore differ from the circuit's behavior before the probe was connected.

The probe's ground lead contributes inductance. Long ground connections can introduce ringing and overshoot into the measurement, particularly in combination with probe capacitance. A short ground connection and a probe with low input capacitance reduce these effects.
