= Corelis =

American electronics company

Corelis, Inc.
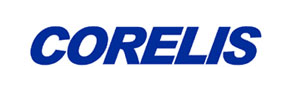
- Type: Private
- Industry: Electronic Testing
- Founded: Cerritos, California, 1991
- Headquarters: Cerritos, California, United States
- Area served: Worldwide
- Parent: Electronic Warfare Associates

Corelis, Inc, a subsidiary of Electronic Warfare Associates, is a private American company based in Cerritos, California.

Dun and Bradstreet categorizes the company in the category of Electronic Equipment & Supplies.

== History ==
Corelis was incorporated in 1991 and initially provided engineering services primarily to the aerospace and defense industries. Corelis introduced their first JTAG boundary scan products in 1998. In 2006, Electronic Warfare Associates, Inc. (EWA) a global provider of technology and engineering services to the aerospace, defense and commercial industries, announced their acquisition of Corelis, Inc. In 2008, the appointment of George B. La Fever as Corelis President and CEO finalized the transition of Corelis, Inc. into EWA Technologies, Inc., a wholly owned subsidiary of the EWA corporate family of high technology companies. In May 2018, David Mason was appointed as Corelis President and CEO.

== Products ==
Corelis offers two distinct types of products and services: Standard Products (Boundary Scan Test Systems and Development Tools); and Custom Test Systems and System Integration.

=== Boundary Scan ===
Corelis introduced their first (JTAG boundary scan products in 1998. Corelis offers boundary scan/JTAG software and hardware products. Its ScanExpress boundary scan systems are used for structural testing as well as JTAG functional emulation test and in-system programming of flash memory, CPLDs, and FPGAs.

In 2007, Corelis released ScanExpress JET, a test tool that combines boundary scan and functional test (FCT) technologies for test coverage.

=== Test Systems and Integration ===
Systems are available for design and debugging, manufacturing test, and field service and support. A variety of system options are available including desktop solutions as well as portable solutions for use in the field with laptops. Corelis also provides engineering services, training, and customer support.

== Projects ==
Between 1991 and 1998, Corelis offered engineering services and licensed HP technologies. Corelis also distributed JTAG Technologies products and took on specific custom design projects from companies such as Motorola and HP.

Corelis, in partnership with Hewlett-Packard, Inc. jointly developed a large-scale test and simulation system for the Motorola Iridium satellite project. The special test equipment system (including the portion provided by Hewlett-Packard) are designed to completely test and simulate the on-board communications systems of the satellite, and to provide a satellite computer software development test bed.

In 1997, Corelis introduced ScanPlus, a high performance, low cost PC platform for executing boundary scan test vectors generated by the HP 3070 in-circuit test family from Hewlett-Packard Company.

Other early Corelis projects include developing processor modules for HP/Agilent based logic analyzers; and developing early emulation products for processors such as the Intel i960 and AMD Am29000.
