= Thomas W. Williams (engineer) =

American engineer (born 1943)

- Born: Thomas W. Williams; August 3, 1943; U.S.
- Education: Clarkson University (BSE); State University of New York at Binghamton (BA.Ma); Colorado State University (PhD.)
- Occupations: Scientist and engineer
- Known for: design for testability

Thomas W. Williams (born August 3, 1943) was an American engineer, Chief Scientist and fellow at Synopsys. He is known for his contributions to electronic design, automation and testing of electronic systems.

== Education and career ==
Williams obtained a bachelor's degree in electrical engineering from Clarkson University, a master's degree in pure mathematics from the State University of New York at Binghamton, and a Ph.D. in electrical engineering from Colorado State University. He worked as a manager of the VLSI Design for Testability group at the IBM Microelectronics Division in Boulder, Colorado. He then joined Synopsys where he became a fellow and Chief Scientist.

Williams was the founder and chair of the IEEE Computer Society workshop on design for testability, as well as the co-founder of the European workshop on design for testability. Williams chaired the IEEE technical subcommittee on design for testability and has been a keynote and invited speaker at international conferences. Williams was honored as a Distinguished Visiting Speaker by the IEEE Computer Society from 1982 to 1985. He served as a special-issue editor for the IEEE Transactions on Computers and the IEEE Transactions on Computer-Aided Design of Integrated Circuits and Systems.

== Awards and accomplishments ==
Williams was named a fellow of the Institute of Electrical and Electronics Engineers in 1988 “for leadership and contributions to the area of design for testability.” In 1989 Williams shared with Edward B. Eichelberger the 1989 IEEE Computer Society W. Wallace McDowell Award “for developing the level-sensitive scan technique of testing solid-state logic circuits and for leading, defining, and promoting design for testability concepts.”

In 2007, Williams received the European Design and Automation Association (EDAA) Lifetime Achievement Award for outstanding contributions to the state of the art in electronic design, automation and testing of electronic systems. This award was presented during the opening session of the Design Automation and Test in Europe conference.

In 2010, Williams was the recipient of the IEEE Test Technology Technical Council Lifetime Contribution Medal.

In 2018, the Electronic System Design Alliance honored Williams with the Phil Kaufman Award "for his outstanding contributions to test automation and his overall impact on the electronics industry".

Williams coauthored four books, 50 refereed publications and 20 patents. He received the following Outstanding Paper Awards:

- in 1987 from the IEEE International Test Conference for work on VLSI self-testing (with W. Daehn, M. Gruetzner, and C. W. Starke),
- in 1987 from the CompEuro’87 for work on self-test,
- in 1989 from the IEEE International Test Conference for work on AC test quality (with U. Park and M. R. Mercer),
- in 1991 from the ACM/IEEE Design Automation Conference for work on synthesis and testing (with B. Underwood and M. R. Mercer).
