= Bed of nails (disambiguation) =

A bed of nails is a board with nails pointing out of it, as lain on by fakirs and ascetics.

Bed of nails may also refer to:

- "Bed of Nails" (song), a 1989 single by American rock singer Alice Cooper
- "Bed of Nails", a song by Hüsker Dü from their 1987 album Warehouse: Songs and Stories
- "Bed of Nails", a song by Wild Beasts from their 2011 album Smother
- Bed of Nails, a 2003 novel by Canadian author Michael Slade
- Bed of nails tester, a device used to test printed circuit boards
- "The Bed of Nails" (Yes Minister), the nineteenth episode of the BBC comedy series Yes Minister
- The bed of nails defense was a proposed system to protect Minuteman missile silos

== See also ==
- Nail bed (disambiguation)
