= Nail bed =

Nail bed may refer to:

- Nail bed (anatomy), the skin beneath the nail plate
- Bed of nails, a device sometimes used in meditation and physics demonstrations
- Bed of nails tester, a device used to test printed circuit boards

== See also ==
- Bed of nails (disambiguation)
