= BSDL =

BSDL may refer to:

- Bile salt dependent lipase
- Bitstream Syntax Description Language used in MPEG-B (ISO/IEC 23001-5)
- Boundary scan description language, a description language for electronics testing
- BSD licenses, a family of permissive free software licences
