= Edward B. Eichelberger =

American engineer (born 1934)

Edward B. Eichelberger (born February 8, 1934, in Norfolk, VA) is an American engineer and wrestler. He holds the distinctions of IBM Fellow and IEEE Fellow (1986) for contributions to VLSI chip design, integrated circuit design, and electronic design automation. Eichelberger shared with Thomas W. Williams (engineer) the 1989 IEEE Computer Society W. Wallace McDowell Award “for developing the level-sensitive scan technique of testing solid-state logic circuits and for leading, defining, and promoting design for testability concepts.” In 2000, Eichelberger received the IEEE Test Technology Technical Council's Lifetime Contribution Medal.

In 2009, Eichelberger was inducted in the National Wrestling Hall of Fame.

== Education and college wrestling ==
As a wrestler, Eichelberger won three state championships for Granby High School. While at Lehigh University, he achieved a career record of 55-3-1 in college wrestling and was Lehigh's first three-time All-America champion. Eichelberger obtained a B.S. degree in electrical engineering from Lehigh University in 1956. He then worked at IBM on solid state circuit design for three years. Eichelberger received a Ph.D. in electrical engineering from Princeton University in 1963.

== Career ==
Eichelberger worked at IBM on chip design, circuit design, electronic design automation and circuit test automation from 1956 until 1994. He received 25 patents. Among his remarkable contributions was a 1965 paper on hazard detection in combinational and sequential circuits. In 1973, he was honored by the IBM Outstanding Contribution Award for the level-sensitive scan design (LSSD) technique. His development of Weighted Random Patterns was recognized with the IBM Outstanding Innovation Award.

Computer History Museum recorded Eichelberger's oral history.
