= TE Connectivity =

Irish-domiciled technology company

TE Connectivity plc
- Formerly: Tyco Electronics Ltd.; TE Connectivity Ltd.
- Type: Public
- Traded as: NYSE: TEL; S&P 500 component
- Industry: Electronics industry
- Founded: June 29, 2007; 19 years ago
- Headquarters: Galway, Ireland
- Key people: Terrence Curtin (CEO)
- Products: Electrical connectors, sensors, relays, cables, heat-shrink tubing
- Revenue: ▲US$19.885 billion (2026)
- Operating income: ▲US$3.991 billion (2026)
- Net income: ▲US$3.253 billion (2026)
- Total assets: ▲US$26.672 billion (2026)
- Total equity: ▲US$13.573 billion (2026)
- Number of employees: 104,000 (2026)
- Website: te.com

TE Connectivity plc is an Irish-incorporated multinational company that designs and manufactures electrical connectors, sensors and other electronic components. Its products are used in the automotive, aerospace, defence, medical and energy industries, as well as industrial automation and data centers.

The company was spun off from Tyco International in 2007 as Tyco Electronics and adopted its current name in 2011.

== History ==
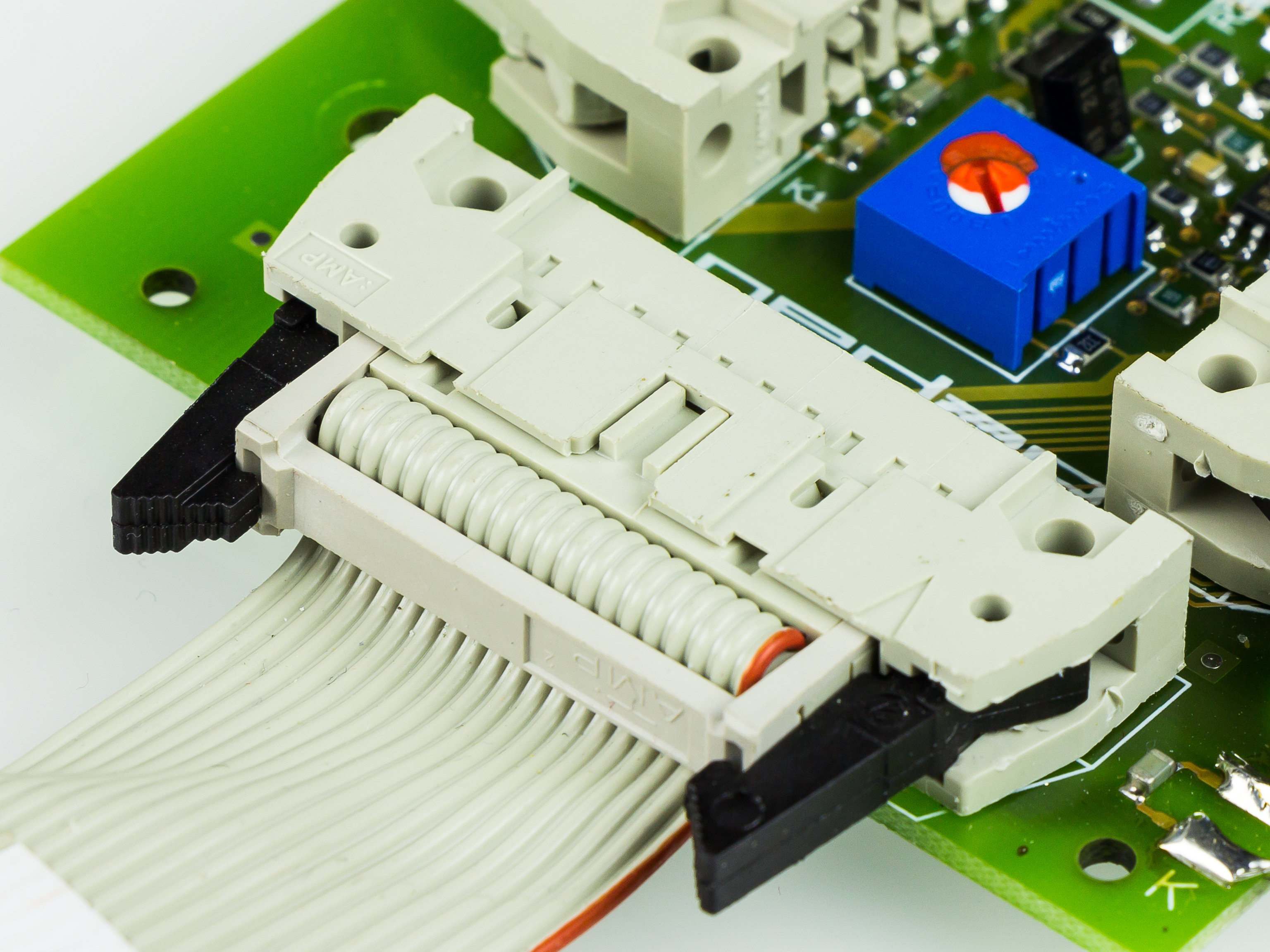
AMP connector

In 1941, Aircraft and Marine Products (AMP) was founded to make solderless electrical connections for quick and removable wire connections used for aircraft and ships. After the war time boom, the company had to adapt to the post-war economy, and in 1956, the name of the company was changed to AMP Incorporated when it re-incorporated. In 1999, Tyco International acquired AMP Incorporated.

In September 2002, the CEO (L. Dennis Kozlowski) and CFO (Mark H. Swartz) of Tyco International Ltd. were indicted on charges including fraud, racketeering, stock manipulation, and more, amounting to more than 600 million dollars of theft.

In July 2007, Tyco separated into three publicly independent companies, Covidien Ltd (formerly Tyco Healthcare), Tyco Electronics Ltd, and Tyco International Ltd (formerly Tyco Fire & Security and Tyco Engineered Products & Services (TFS/TEPS)).

In 2010, the company's Tyco Telecommunications division, which provided and installed submarine communications cables, was renamed to Tyco Electronics Subsea Communications.

On March 10, 2011, Tyco Electronics Ltd changed its name to TE Connectivity Ltd., which the company said felt more relevant to its position as a connectivity and sensor component manufacturer.

On August 28, 2015, TE Connectivity announced that it has completed the sale of its broadband-networks business to CommScope Holding Co. for about US$3 billion.

On February 12, 2025, TE Connectivity announced its intent to acquire Richards Manufacturing, a manufacturer of overhead and underground electrical and gas distribution products, for approximately US$2.3 billion.

== Products and services ==
=== Transportation ===
The Transportation Solutions segment produces electrical connectors, sensors and other components for cars and commercial vehicles. Its products are used in vehicle electrical systems, including powertrains, safety and infotainment systems. TE also manufactures high-voltage connectors for electric vehicle batteries and charging systems, along with high-speed data connectors used in infotainment and driver-assistance systems.

The segment also supplies components for trucks, buses, agricultural and construction vehicles.

=== Industrial ===
TE's Industrial Solutions business makes connectors for data centers and communications equipment, alongside products for factory and building automation. Its products are used in robotics and process control, HVAC systems, household appliances, railway vehicles and railway signalling equipment.

For electricity networks and renewable energy projects, the segment manufactures electrical connection, insulation and cable-protection products. It also supplies electronic components for aerospace, defence and marine applications. TE also manufactures components for medical imaging, diagnostic equipment and minimally invasive surgical devices.

== See also ==
- F crimp
- MICTOR
- Connectors
- Sensors
- Relays
- Contactors
