= Flying probe =

System for in-circuit testing of printed circuit boards

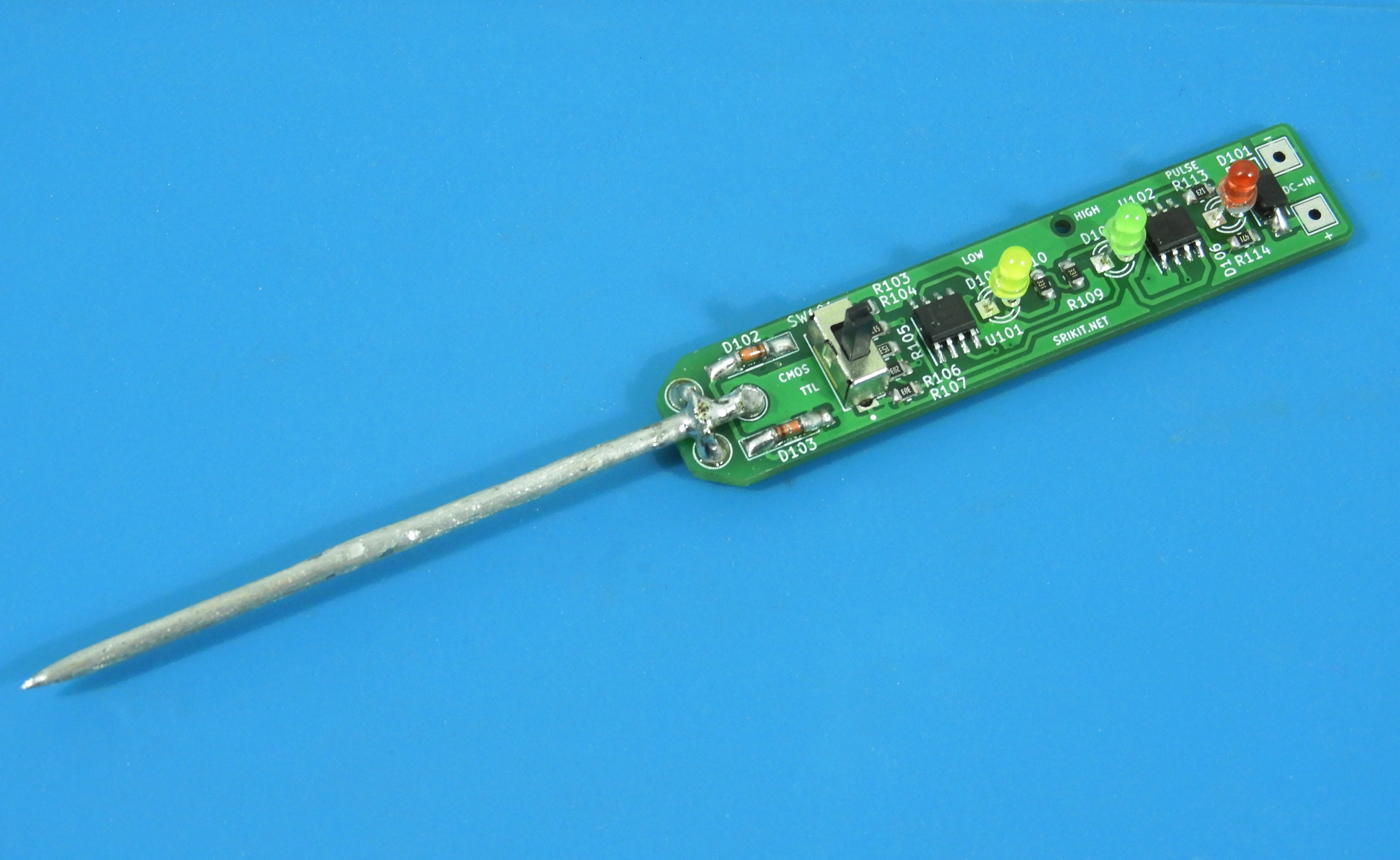
A universal logic probe

Flying probes are test probes used for testing both bare circuit boards and boards loaded with components. Flying probes were introduced in the late 1980s and can be found in many manufacturing and assembly operations, most often in manufacturing of electronic printed circuit boards. A flying probe tester uses one or more test probes to make contact with the circuit board under test; the probes are moved from place to place on the circuit board to carry out tests of multiple conductors or components. Flying probe testers are a more flexible alternative to bed of nails testers, which use multiple contacts to simultaneously contact the board and which rely on electrical switching to carry out measurements.

One limitation in flying probe test methods is the speed at which measurements can be taken; the probes must be moved to each new test site on the board, and then a measurement must be completed. Bed-of-nails testers touch each test point simultaneously and electronic switching of instruments between test pins is more rapid than movement of probes. The manufacturing of bed-of-nails testers, however, is more costly.

== Loaded board in-circuit test ==
In the testing of printed circuit boards, a flying probe test or fixtureless in-circuit test (FICT) system may be used for testing low to mid volume production, prototypes, and boards that present accessibility problems. A traditional "bed of nails" tester for testing a PCB requires a custom fixture to hold the assembled printed circuit board (PCBA) and the pogo pins which make contact with the PCBA. In contrast, FICT uses two or more flying probes, which may be moved based on software instruction. The flying probes are electro-mechanically controlled to access components on printed circuit assemblies (PCAs). The probes are moved around the board under test using an automatically operated two-axis system, and one or more test probes contact components of the board or test points on the printed circuit board.

The main advantage of flying probe testing is the substantial cost of a bed-of-nails fixture, costing on the order of US $20,000, is not required. The flying probes also allow easy modification of the test fixture when the PCBA design changes. FICT may be used on both bare or assembled PCBs. However, since the tester makes measurements serially, instead of making many measurements at once, the test cycle may become much longer than for a bed-of-nails fixture. A test cycle that takes 30 seconds on such a system may take an hour with flying probes. Test coverage may not be as comprehensive as a bed of nails tester (assuming similar net access for each), because fewer points are tested at one time.
