= W. Wallace McDowell Award =

Technical award

- Awarded for: Significant achievements in information technology
- Presented by: IEEE Computer Society
- First award: 1966
- Website: https://www.computer.org/volunteering/awards/mcdowell

The W. Wallace McDowell Award is awarded by the IEEE Computer Society for outstanding theoretical, design, educational, practical, or related innovative contributions that fall within the scope of Computer Society interest. This is the highest technical award made solely by the IEEE Computer Society where selection of the awardee is based on the "highest level of technical accomplishment and achievement". The IEEE Computer Society (with over 85000 members from every field of computing) is "dedicated to advancing the theory, practice, and application of computer and information processing technology." Another award considered to be the "most prestigious technical award in computing" is the A. M. Turing Award awarded by Association for Computing Machinery (ACM). This is popularly referred to as the "computer science's equivalent of the Nobel Prize". The W. Wallace McDowell Award is sometimes popularly referred to as the "IT Nobel".

The award is named after W. Wallace McDowell who was director of engineering at IBM, during the development of the landmark product IBM 701. Mr. McDowell was responsible for the transition from electro-mechanical techniques to electronics, and the subsequent transition to solid state devices.

== W. Wallace McDowell Award recipients ==
Year	Recipients	Citation
1966	Fernando J. Corbató	For his pioneering work in organizing and spearheading the early development of the first practical large-scale time-sharing computer system, and for his tireless efforts in providing direction for the entire time-sharing concept.
1967	John W. Backus	For his early and continuing contribution to the field of higher-level languages, in particular for his conception and leadership resulting in the completion of the first FORTRAN projects; and for his work in syntactical forms incorporated in ALGOL.
1968	Seymour R. Cray	For his continuing technical contributions to computer development through design automation and system definition, and for outstanding managerial leadership in producing a series of large scale computers.
1969	Herman Lukoff	For his insight and leadership in solving primary problems of early computers and his continuing contributions that have paved the way for tomorrows computing systems.
1970	Frederick P. Brooks, Jr.	For his significant contributions to computer architecture and programming and his leadership in cooperative efforts to further education in the computer field.
1971	Tom Kilburn	For his achievement in designing and building some of the first-- as well as some of the most powerful -- computers in the world.
1972	Jean A. Hoerni	For significantly influencing the architecture and design of data processing systems by inventing the planar process of semi-conductor circuit fabrication -- the development that made possible the economical mass production of reliable integrated circuits and semi-conductor memories.
1973	David A. Huffman	For his contributions to the solution of sequential circuit problems and coding theory, and for his leadership as a teacher.
1974	Shmuel Winograd	For his pioneering work in computational complexity and for stimulating further research on the scientific basis for evaluating the efficiency of computational algorithms.
1975	C. Gordon Bell	For outstanding contributions in the areas of technical design, education, and publications influential in developing the computer field.
1976	Gene M. Amdahl	For his contributions to the architecture and design of computer systems, and for his achievements in promoting advancements in the computer state of the art through business enterprise.
1977	Robert S. Barton	For his innovative architectural computer concepts, such as stack processing, data stored with self-describing tags, and the direct execution of higher level languages, as embodied in the B-5000 and successor machines.
1978	Gordon E. Moore	For outstanding contributions to research and development of semi-conductor components and his insights and leadership in the micro-processor and semi conductor memory fields.
1979	Grace Murray Hopper	For her combination of technical skill, leadership, teaching capability, and single-minded drive for the invention, adoption, and standardization of high-level programming languages.
1980	Donald E. Knuth	For his many contributions to software engineering and education and for the excellence of his scholarship and creativity in organizing vast subject areas of computer science so that they are accessible to all segments of the computing community.
1981	Maurice V. Wilkes	For a lifetime of innovative technical contributions to the computer field in the areas of software engineering, structured programming, distributed computing, data base structures, time-sharing, storage hierarchies, paging, and microprogramming.
1982	Rex Rice	For his outstanding technical and managerial contributions to computer development through the invention of the universally utilized dual-in-line semi-conductor component package, and the design and production of the first large LSI semi-conductor memory systems.
1983	Daniel Slotnick	For his pioneering contributions to centrally controlled parallel computers and for his achievement in creating the parallel computer ILLIAC IV.
1984	Thomas M. McWilliams and Lawrence C. Widdoes, Jr.	For creating the structured computer-aided logic (SCALD) design methodology, which is the basis for many of the successful computer-aided engineering systems used in the industry.
1985	William D. Strecker	For being principal designer of the VAX architecture and for contributions to local area networks, high-performance interconnects, caches, and memory hierarchies.
1987	Sidney Fernbach	For continuously challenging, inspiring, and supporting American designers and industry to produce many successive generations of super computers.
1988	William Poduska	For his continued creative contributions to hardware and software developments and for management expertise in bringing them to products.
1989	Edward B. Eichelberger and Thomas W. Williams	For developing the level-sensitive scan technique of testing solid-state logic circuits and for leading, defining, and promoting design for testability concepts."
1990	Lawrence G. Roberts	For designing packet switching technology and bringing it into practical use by means of the ARPA network.
1994	Federico Faggin	For the development of the Silicon Gate Process, and the first commercial microprocessor.
1995	Ken Kennedy	For important contributions to theory and practice of compiler optimization and leadership in the development of software for parallel computation.
1996	Timothy Berners-Lee	For innovative invention of the World Wide Web, which extends hypertext to distributed information, which has brought about a revolutionary transformation in the use of computers and networks.
1997	Marc Andreessen and Eric Bina	For Developing a Multi-Platform Browsing Tool for the World Wide Web.
1998	Tilak Agerwala	For outstanding contributions to the development of high performance computers.
1999	Yale Patt	For your impact on the high performance microprocessor industry via a combination of important contributions to both engineering and education.
2000	Raymond Ozzie	For his vision, determination, and programming skill in the development of Lotus Notes, a program that enables groups of people to work collaboratively over computer networks.
2001	Pradeep K. Khosla	For significant contributions to the design of re-configurable real-time software systems, and for significant contributions to undergraduate and graduate education in electrical and computer engineering and robotics.
2002	Jaishankar Menon	For leading contributions on the architecture and design of data storage systems and RAID technology.
2003	Sartaj K. Sahni	For contributions to the theory of NP-hard and NP-complete problems.
2004	Simon Lam	For outstanding fundamental contributions in network protocols and security services.
2005	Krishan K. Sabnani	For seminal contributions to networking protocols and to wireless data networks.
2006	Benjamin W. Wah	For fundamental contributions to the theory and applications of nonlinear and resource-constrained optimization.
2007	Anil K. Jain	For pioneering contributions to theory, technique, and practice of pattern recognition, computer vision, and biometric recognition systems.
2008	Krishna Palem	For pioneering contributions to the algorithmic, compilation, and architectural foundations of embedded computing.
2009	Jiawei Han	For significant contributions to knowledge discovery and data mining.
2011	Ian F. Akyildiz	For pioneering contributions to wireless sensor network architectures and communication protocols.
2012	Ronald Fagin	For fundamental and lasting contributions to the theory of databases.
2013	Maurice Herlihy	For fundamental contributions to the theory and practice of multi-processor computation.
2014	Hanan Samet	For fundamental contributions to the development of multidimensional spatial data structures and indexing, translation validation, and proof-carrying code.
2015	Viktor K. Prasanna	For fundamental algorithmic and application specific architectural contributions to reconfigurable computing.
2016	Dexter C. Kozen	For groundbreaking contributions to topics ranging from computational complexity, to the analysis of algebraic computations, to logics of programs and verification.
2017	Srinivas Devadas	For fundamental contributions that have shaped the field of secure hardware, impacting circuits, microprocessors, and systems.
2018	Moti Yung	For innovative contributions to computer and network security, predicting, both, attack scenarios and design needs in this important evolving area.
2019	Rajesh K. Gupta	For seminal contributions in design and implementation of Microelectronic Systems-on-Chip and Cyberphysical Systems.
2020	Sushil Jajodia	For contributions to the scientific and engineering principles that enable effective adaptive cyber defense.
2021	Charu C. Aggarwal	For contributions to knowledge discovery and data mining.
2022	Rafail Ostrovsky	For visionary contributions to computer security theory and practice, including foreseeing new cloud vulnerabilities and then pioneering corresponding novel solutions.
2023	Amit P. Sheth	For pioneering and enduring contributions to information integration, data and service semantics, and knowledge-enhanced computing.
2024	Ming Li	For pioneering and enduring contributions to modern information theory and bioinformatics
2025	Raghu Meka	For contributions to complexity theory, pseudo randomness, communication complexity, and for establishing new connections between computer science and combinatorics, probability theory.

== See also ==
- List of computer-related awards
- List of computer science awards
