= Automated X-ray inspection =

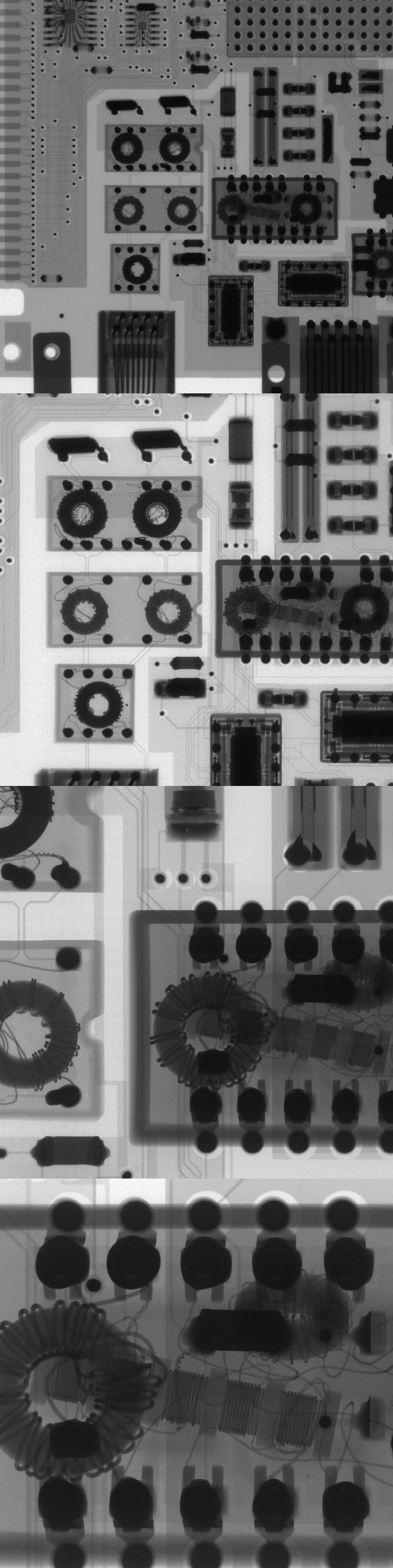
X-ray of an electronic circuit board (zoom series into an old token ring network adapter board).

Automated X-ray inspection (AXI) is a technology based on the same principles as automated optical inspection (AOI). It uses X-rays as its source, instead of visible light, to automatically inspect features, which are typically hidden from view.

Automated X-ray inspection is used in a wide range of industries and applications, predominantly with two major goals:

1. Process optimization, i.e. the results of the inspection are used to optimize following processing steps,
2. Anomaly detection, i.e. the result of the inspection serve as a criterion to reject a part (for scrap or re-work).

While AOI is mainly associated with electronics manufacturing (due to widespread use in printed circuit board manufacturing), AXI has a much wider range of applications. It ranges from the quality check of alloy wheels to the detection of bone fragments in processed meat. Wherever large numbers of very similar items are produced according to a defined standard, automatic inspection using advanced image processing and pattern recognition software (Computer vision) has become a useful tool to ensure quality and improve yield in processing and manufacturing.

== Principle of operation ==
While optical inspection produces full color images of the surface of the object, x-ray inspection transmits x-rays through the object and records gray scale images of the shadows cast. The image is then processed by image processing software that detects the position and size/ shape of expected features (for process optimization) or presence/ absence of unexpected/ unintended objects or features (for anomaly detection).

X-rays are generated by an x-ray tube, usually located directly above or below the object under inspection. A detector located the opposite side of the object records an image of the x-rays transmitted through the object. The detector either converts the x-rays first into visible light which is imaged by an optical camera, or detects directly using an x-ray sensor array. The object under inspection may be imaged at higher magnification by moving the object closer to the x-ray tube, or at lower magnification closer to the detector.

Since the image is produced due to the different absorption of x-rays when passing through the object, it can reveal structures inside the object that are hidden from outside view.

== Applications ==
With the advancement of image processing software the number applications for automated x-ray inspection is huge and constantly growing. The first applications started off in industries where the safety aspect of components demanded a careful inspection of each part produced (e.g. welding seams for metal parts in nuclear power stations) because the technology was expectedly very expensive in the beginning. But with wider adoption of the technology, prices came down significantly and opened automated x-ray inspection up to a much wider field- partially fueled again by safety aspects (e.g. detection of metal, glass or other materials in processed food) or to increase yield and optimize processing (e.g. detection of size and location of holes in cheese to optimize slicing patterns).

In mass production of complex items (e.g. in electronics manufacturing), an early detection of defects can drastically reduce overall cost, because it prevents defective parts from being used in subsequent manufacturing steps. This results in three major benefits: a) it provides feedback at the earliest possible state that materials are defective or process parameters got out of control, b) it prevents adding value to components that are already defective and therefore reduces the overall cost of a defect, and c) it increases the likelihood of field defects of the final product, because the defect may not be detected at later stages in quality inspection or during functional testing due to the limited set of test patterns.

== Use of AXI in the food industry ==
Foreign body detection, fill level control, and process control are the three main areas for the use of AXI in the food industry. Especially in packaged goods at the end of the filling and packaging line the use of X-ray scanners has become the norm, rather than the exception. It is often used in combination with other QA measures, especially inline check weighers.

Most of it is limited to a good/ bad check, i.e. it produces rejects after the AXI station, but in some applications it is directly used for process control where the data from the AXI are fed to the process and can control other variables. An often cited example is the control of the thickness of cheese slices after an AXI determined the distribution and position of 'holes' inside the cheese block. (to ensure consistent total package weight).

Recently, automated methods have been developed for X-ray inspection of food passing by on a conveyor belt.

== Use of AXI in electronics manufacturing ==
The increasing usage of ICs (integrated circuits) with packages such as BGAs (ball grid array) where the connections are underneath the chip and not visible, means that ordinary optical inspection is impossible. Because the connections are underneath the chip package there is a greater need to ensure that the manufacturing process is able to accommodate these chips correctly. Additionally the chips that use BGA packages tend to be the larger ones with many connections. Therefore, it is essential that all the connections are made correctly.

The process of X-ray inspection is to obtain the internal structure of the test object, and then observe the internal information of the test object without breaking the test object.

AXI is often paired with the testing provided by boundary scan test, in-circuit test, and functional test.

=== Process ===
As BGA connections are not visible, the only alternative is to use a low level X-ray inspection. AXI is able to find faults such as opens, shorts, insufficient solder, excessive solder, missing electrical parts, and mis-aligned components. Defects are detected and repaired within short debug time.

These inspection systems are more costly than ordinary optical systems, but they are able to check all the connections, even those underneaths the chip package.

To achieve highest throughput, AXI machines use single 2D X-ray images where possible to make a decision. However, as the density of components on both sides of the PCB increases, it is harder to achieve a clear 2D image that is not obscured by other components. Techniques such as tomosynthesis are often used to filter out background components by first creating a 3D model from multiple X-ray images taken from different angles.

== Related technologies ==
The following are related technologies and are also used in electronic production to test for the correct operation of electronics printed circuit boards.

- In-circuit test (ICT)
- Joint Test Action Group (JTAG)
- Automated optical inspection (AOI)
- Functional testing (see acceptance testing)
