= W. Wallace McDowell =

American engineer

- Born: 1906
- Died: March 2, 1985 (aged 79); Florida, USA
- Citizenship: American
- Education: Massachusetts Institute of Technology (MIT)
- Occupation: Engineer
- Years active: 1930-1968
- Employer: IBM

William Wallace McDowell, also known as W. Wallace McDowell, (1906–1985) was American Engineer, who worked for IBM and became vice president and spent his entire 38-year career at IBM. He was a pivotal IBM engineering executive who successfully steered the company's transition from electromechanical punch-card machines to the era of electronic computing, and he managed the development of the company's first commercial electronic computers.

The W. Wallace McDowell Award of the IEEE is named in his honor.

== Career ==
McDowell studied at the Massachusetts Institute of Technology (MIT) where he received his bachelor's degree in Engineering Management in 1930. That same year he joined IBM, where he first worked in the sales department, but by 1931 as a developer he had switched to the engineering laboratory in Endicott, New York. In 1936 he became assistant to the Vice President of IBM, and in 1939, Assistant Manager of Engineering. In 1942 he became Manager of the engineering laboratory in Endicott, and in 1950, IBM Director of Engineering. In 1954 he became Vice President of IBM. He retired in 1968 as Resident Vice President (a position he had held since 1960).

During World War II, McDowell was responsible for nearly one hundred engineering projects at IBM on behalf of the US government and led the conversion of the engineering department to civilian purposes after the war ended. he led the transition from electromechanical to electronic computers, which was realized at IBM with the IBM 701 in 1952. He was responsible for the expansion of IBM laboratories in the 1950s, in addition to Endicott, Poughkeepsie, San Jose, and Zurich.

Beyond his technical work, he served as the first chairman of the advisory board for the IBM Journal of Research and Development. and served as President of the Broome County Chamber of Commerce.

== Legacy ==
In 1965, the IEEE Computer Society established the W. Wallace McDowell Award to honor his contributions. It is the highest technical award given solely by the IEEE Computer Society and recognizes outstanding theoretical, design, educational, practical, or innovative contributions to the computer field.
