= Serial Vector Format =

Serial Vector Format (SVF) is a file format that contains boundary scan vectors to be sent to an electronic circuit using a JTAG interface. Boundary scan vectors consist of the following data:

- Stimulus data: This is data to be sent to a device or electronic circuit
- Expected response: This is the data the device or circuit is expected to send back if there is no error
- Mask data: Defines which bits in the expected response are valid; other bits of the device's response are unknown and must be ignored when comparing the expected response and the data returned from the circuit
- Additional information on how to send the data (e.g. maximum clock frequency)

The SVF standard was jointly developed by companies Texas Instruments and Teradyne. Control over the format has been handed off to boundary-scan solution provider ASSET InterTech. The most recent revision is Revision E.

SVF files are used to transfer boundary scan data between tools. As an example a VHDL compiler may create an SVF file that is read by a tool for programming CPLDs.

The SVF file is defined as an ASCII file that consists of a set of SVF statements. The maximum number of characters allowed on a line is 256, although one SVF statement can span more than one line. Each statement consists of a command and associated parameters. Each SVF statement is terminated by a semicolon. SVF is not case sensitive. Comments can be inserted into a SVF file after an exclamation point ‘!’ or a pair of slashes ‘//’. Either ‘//’ or ‘!’ will comment out the remainder of the line.

== SVF commands ==
- ENDDR: Specifies default end state for DR scan operations.
- ENDIR: Specifies default end state for IR scan operations.
- FREQUENCY: Specifies maximum test clock frequency for IEEE 1149.1 bus operations.
- HDR: (Header Data Register) Specifies a header pattern that is prepended to the beginning of subsequent DR scan operations.
- HIR: (Header Instruction Register) Specifies a header pattern that is prepended to the beginning of subsequent IR scan operations.
- PIO: (Parallel Input/Output) Specifies a parallel test pattern.
- PIOMAP: (Parallel Input/Output Map) Maps PIO column positions to a logical pin.
- RUNTEST: Forces the IEEE 1149.1 bus to a run state for a specified number of clocks or a specified time period.
- SDR: (Scan Data Register) Performs an IEEE 1149.1 Data Register scan.
- SIR: (Scan Instruction Register) Performs an IEEE 1149.1 Instruction Register scan.
- STATE: Forces the IEEE 1149.1 bus to a specified stable state.
- TDR: (Trailer Data Register) Specifies a trailer pattern that is appended to the end of subsequent DR scan operations.
- TIR: (Trailer Instruction Register) Specifies a trailer pattern that is appended to the end of subsequent IR scan operations.
- TRST: (Test ReSeT) Controls the optional Test Reset line.
