= In-target probe =

Device used in computer hardware

In-target probe (ITP) is a device used in computer hardware and microprocessor design, to control a target microprocessor or similar ASIC at the register level. It generally allows full control of the target device and allows the computer engineer access to individual processor registers, program counter, and instructions within the device. It allows the processor to be single-stepped or for breakpoints to be set. Unlike an in-circuit emulator (ICE), an In-Target Probe uses the target device to execute, rather than substituting for the target device.

== See also ==
- Hardware-assisted virtualization
- In-circuit emulator
- Joint Test Action Group
