= Bed of nails defense =

Missile defense

The bed of nails defense and the related pebble fan defense are anti-ballistic missile concepts intended to defend missile silos against attack.

The bed of nails consists of a field of 2-metre (7 ft) long steel rebars rising vertically out of the ground in a pattern in front of the silo to be defended. Warheads aimed at missile silos will hit at least one of the rebars before hitting the ground, potentially destroying the warhead before it can trigger. The pebble fan is a similar concept consisting of a long strip of gunpowder topped with steel balls which would be triggered to fly into the air and produce a "curtain" of pellets.

Although neither system is wholly effective, compared with other missile defenses they cost very little to build, and are effective enough to increase the number of failed attacks and thus demand a larger number of warheads be expended in any attack on the silo – leaving the attacker fewer warheads to use on other targets. Moreover, the results of a counterforce attack would be much less predictable, making such an attack less valuable.

The question of the survivability of the Minuteman missile force was repeatedly raised by the Department of Defense (DOD) after 1969. Although these simple protective measures could be deployed rapidly and for almost no cost, there was practically no interest on the part of the DOD or US Air Force to do so. Much of this appears to be due to the desire to replace Minuteman with the MX missile.

== Counterforce attacks ==
Modern ICBM reentry vehicles (RVs) are shaped like a cone to have low hypersonic drag. This reduces the time they spend flying through the atmosphere during reentry, lowering the effect of unknown winds, and reducing the time they are vulnerable to counterattack. For instance, a high-drag RV falling at about 100 metres per second (330 ft/s) would take a minute to cross the last 6 kilometres (3.7 mi) of the atmosphere, in a 30-kilometre-per-hour (19 mph) wind, the RV would be blown off course by 500 metres (1,600 ft). At that speed, it would also be a target for conventional short-range anti-aircraft guns like the M61 Vulcan.

To destroy a Minuteman missile silo, a 1 MT explosion has to take place within about 500 metres (1,600 ft) with enough of the explosion's energy going into the ground to be effective. This demands the warhead explode at a very low altitude, ideally around 250 metres (800 ft). In the early 1970s, Soviet RVs were thought to have accuracy on the order of 1 nautical mile (1.9 km; 1.2 mi), just enough to get one into the lethal radius if two were fired at every silo.

After travelling in a ballistic path, enemy RVs would approach the silos from the north at an elevation angle of about 22 degrees above the horizon. While the accuracy of the guidance system is enough to get them within range in terms of ground radius, that same accuracy is far too low to ensure it would be at the correct altitude as it passed over the silo. Some form of direct measurement of altitude would be needed.

Assume one uses a barometer-type altimeter set to trigger at 250 metres; if the sensor is 1% inaccurate in measuring altitude based on a nominal 14.7 psi (1,010 mbar) atmospheric pressure, that represents an altitude difference of 120 metres (390 ft). This would still be lethal in terms of altitude. However, travelling at a 22 degree angle means that the time it takes to cross that 120-metre altitude inaccuracy will have it move 250 metres (820 ft) laterally, which may take it outside the lethal radius.

Another possibility is to use a radio altimeter or similar device which directly measures the distance to the ground and thus can accurately trigger. The problem with this approach is that the defenders could send out signals from ground-based radios that would either confuse the altimeter or cause it to trigger prematurely. Such a system would be "the height of foolishness given American jamming prowess".

As a result, based on the technology of the 1970s, the only effective way to attack a silo is with contact fuzing. Inaccuracy is that of the RV's internal guidance, but when exploded on the surface it puts the maximum amount of energy into the ground and thus maximizes the lethal radius.

== Bed of nails ==
The bed of nails was a concept that was intended to counter contact-fused weapons. It consisted of a field of conventional steel rebars each 2 metres (7 ft) long and driven into the ground about 0.6 metres (2 ft). They were arranged in lines with the bars 1 metre (3 ft) apart in a row about 600 metres (2,000 ft) long. 150 such rows were arranged 5 metres (16 ft) apart. The result was a field 600 metres wide, 450 metres long, and about 1.4 metres high.

Given the low approach angle, any warhead aimed at the silo that would fall close enough to be lethal would strike one of the rebars and be destroyed. There is a chance that the fuse would hit the bar and trigger, or that the RV would survive the strike and hit the ground and trigger, but these are relatively small possibilities. In an all-out counterforce attack scenario, the system would at least ensure a good population of US missiles would survive, ensuring a counterstrike capability and that mutually assured destruction would not be compromised.

The estimated system cost was about $60,000 per silo in 1976.

== Pebble curtain ==
The closely related pebble curtain concept can be thought of as an active version of the bed of nails. This consists of a 300-metre (1,000 ft) wide stripe of propellant, normally gunpowder, with many 10-gram (0.35 oz) steel pellets on top. In total, there would be about 10 tons of pellets, costing about $2,000, and 1 ton of propellant. When triggered, the pellets are thrown vertically into the air, forming a "curtain" of balls. Like the bed of nails, an RV hitting one of these pellets would likely be destroyed. The main advantage of this system is that as it is buried, it is much more difficult to destroy.

Unlike the bed of nails, which is entirely passive, the pebble curtain would have to be triggered at the right moment. This would normally be accomplished by placing a radar a short distance north of the silo. As the radar is looking up at the side of the RV as it passes, the return is some 1,000 to 10,000 times greater than looking at it nose-on. This means even a very small radar system would have the required performance. If the balls are replaced by small darts, the amount of propellant is reduced and the vertical coverage increases, a concept known as a porcupine. It is otherwise identical in concept.

== Countermeasures ==
There is a simple way to defeat these systems, although it is at the cost of adding one more warhead to the attack. In this system, two warheads would be aimed at the silo, one with a barometer-type altimeter that arrives first, and then a second that is contact fused. The goal of the first warhead is to explode above the silo and flatten the bed of nails. This does not require high accuracy and thus a barometer would work. The second RV would then be able to contact fuse.

The pebble bed, being buried, is much more robust and would likely survive such an explosion. But because the defense cannot know what any particular warhead is doing, any RV approaching the silo would require the system to be triggered. After a short time, the pellets fall back to the ground and the following warheads will not be intercepted.

It was assumed that two warheads would need to be aimed at every US silo to ensure at least one would hit close enough to be lethal. Because the dust thrown up by one warhead will destroy any following behind, both have to impact as close as possible in time. Thus one could not use one of the two existing RVs aimed at the silo for this purpose, a third dedicated to this role would be needed. However, that first warhead is not attacking the silo and does not have to be very accurate, a single warhead would be enough to ensure this part of the attack worked. Thus, adding these defenses might demand three warheads per silo rather than two.

== Never built ==
From 1969, the US Department of Defense (DOD) began to raise the concern that future Soviet RVs, from the 1970s, would be powerful and accurate enough to attack the Minuteman missile force. They began to study new solutions to ensure the ICBM force would survive such an attack in enough numbers to ensure that an effective counterattack would be possible. This led to the MX missile project and its many changes in basing strategy as the nature of the threat changed.

Despite the DODs comments on the pressing nature of the problem, and the fact that the bed of nails could be deployed immediately and at low cost, the DOD and US Air Force expressed almost no interest in doing so. At the time the concept was proposed, it was noted that "Such systems, perhaps because of the old-fashioned technology employed or because they are incapable of defending a large spectrum of targets, arouse little interest within the Defense Department. This is surprising in the view of the enormous emphasis given by the Secretaries of Defence, among others, since 1969 to the question of Minuteman vulnerability." He later added that the lack of interest was likely due to such a system making the advancement of the MX more difficult to justify.

The only comments about the systems were from the Ballistic Missile Defense Agency deputy program manager, who stated that the concepts were "difficult to synthesize and still meet the criteria of low cost, rapid deployability and adequate effectiveness."
