= Level-sensitive scan design =

Part of an integrated circuit manufacturing test process

Within the field of electronics Level-sensitive scan design (LSSD) is part of an integrated circuit manufacturing test process. It is a DFT scan design method which uses separate system and scan clocks to distinguish between normal and test mode. Latches are used in pairs, each has a normal data input, data output and clock for system operation. For test operation, the two latches form a master/slave pair with one scan input, one scan output and non-overlapping scan clocks A and B which are held low during system operation but cause the scan data to be latched when pulsed high during scan.

	  ____
	 |    |
 Sin ----|S   |
 A ------|>   |
	 |   Q|---+--------------- Q1
 D1 -----|D   |   |
 CLK1 ---|>   |   |
	 |____|	  |    ____
		  |   |	   |
		  +---|S   |
 B -------------------|>   |
		      |	  Q|------ Q2 / SOut
 D2 ------------------|D   |
 CLK2 ----------------|>   |
		      |____|

In a single latch LSSD configuration, the second latch is used only for scan operation. Allowing it to be used as a second system latch reduces the silicon overhead.

== See also ==
- Boundary scan
- In-circuit test
- JTAG
