= Automated optical inspection =

System for visual inspection of printed circuit boards by a computerized system

An automated optical inspection device

Automated optical inspection (AOI) is an automated visual inspection of printed circuit board (PCB) (or LCD, transistor) manufacture where a camera autonomously scans the device under test for both catastrophic failure (e.g. missing component) and quality defects (e.g. fillet size or shape or component skew). It is commonly used in the manufacturing process because it is a non-contact test method. Modern AOI systems increasingly incorporate artificial intelligence and deep learning techniques to improve defect detection and analysis of electronic assemblies. It is implemented at many stages through the manufacturing process including bare board inspection, solder paste inspection (SPI), pre-reflow and post-re-flow as well as other stages.

Historically, the primary place for AOI systems has been after solder re-flow or "post-production." This is mainly because post-re-flow AOI systems can inspect for most types of defects (component placement, solder shorts, missing solder, etc.) at one place in the line with one single system. In this way, the faulty boards are reworked and the other boards are sent to the next process stage.

== SMT inspection ==
AOIs for a PCB with components may inspect the following features:

- Area defects
- Billboarding
- Component offset
- Component polarity
- Component presence or absence
- Component skew
- Excessive solder joints
- Flipped component
- Height defects
- Insufficient paste around Leads
- Insufficient solder Joints
- Lifted leads
- No population tests
- Paste registration
- Severely damaged components
- Tombstoning
- Volume defects
- Wrong part
- Solder bridging
- Presence of foreign material on the board

AOI can be used in the following locations in the SMT lines: post paste, pre-reflow, post-reflow, or wave areas.

== Bare PCB inspection ==
AOI for a bare PCB inspection may detect these features:

- Line width violations
- Spacing violation
- Excess copper
- Missing pad – a feature that should be on the board is missing
- Short circuits
- Gold finger damage
- Cuts
- Hole breakage – a drilled hole (via) is outside of its landing pad
- Wrong mounting components identified

The triggering of a defects report may be either rule-based (e.g. no lines on the board should be smaller than 50μ) or CAD based in which the board is locally compared with the intended design.

This inspection is much more reliable and repeatable than manual visual inspection.

In many cases, smaller circuit board designs are driving up the demand for AOI vs in-circuit testing.

== Related technologies ==
The following are related technologies and are also used in electronic production to test for the correct operation of electronics printed circuit boards:

- Automated X-ray inspection (AXI)
- Joint Test Action Group (JTAG)
- In-circuit test (ICT)
- Functional testing

== See also ==
- Object recognition
- Machine vision
- Automated X-ray inspection
- Under vehicle inspection
