= In-circuit testing =

Method of testing electronic circuits

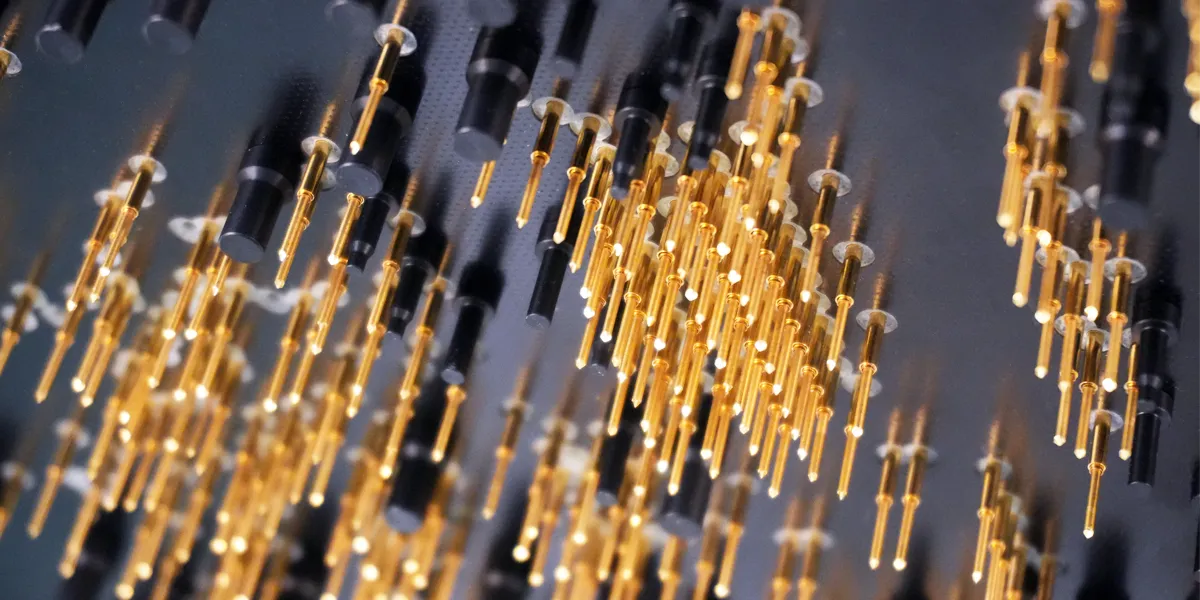
This image shows a close-up of pins inside an in-circuit test fixture

In-circuit testing (ICT) is an example of white box testing where an electrical probe tests a populated printed circuit board (PCB), checking for shorts, opens, resistance, capacitance, and other basic quantities which will show whether the assembly was correctly fabricated. It may be performed with a "bed of nails" test fixture and specialist test equipment, or with a fixtureless in-circuit test setup. In-circuit test (ICT) is a widely used and cost-efficient method for testing medium- to high-volume electronic printed circuit board assemblies (PCBAs). It has maintained its popularity over the years due to its ability to diagnose component-level faults and its operational speed.

Using in-circuit test fixtures is a very effective way of maintaining standards when carrying out tests. It can help to reduce production downtime by identifying faults early in the testing process, ensuring that defective products are removed from the production line and fixed.

== Fixtures for in-circuit testing ==
A common form of in-circuit testing uses a bed-of-nails tester. This is a fixture that uses an array of spring-loaded pins known as "pogo pins". When a printed circuit board is aligned with and pressed down onto the bed-of-nails tester, the pins make electrical contact with locations on the circuit board, allowing them to be used as test points for in-circuit testing. Bed-of-nails testers have the advantage that many tests may be performed at a time, but have the disadvantage of placing substantial strain on the PCB.

An alternative is the use of flying probes, which place less mechanical strain on the boards being tested. Their advantages and disadvantages are the opposite of bed-of-nails testers: the flying probes must be moved between tests, but they place much less strain on the PCB.

There are a range of companies who specifically create in-circuit test fixtures and test systems, including companies such as Teradyne & Keysight who build and manufacture test systems. There are also a range of independent fixture houses which supply and manufacture in-circuit test fixtures such as INGUN (who provide fixture kits), Forwessun, Rematek & Moteco.

== Example test sequence ==
- Discharging capacitors and especially electrolytic capacitors (for safety and measurement stability, this test sequence must be done first before testing any other items)
- Contact test (to verify the test system is connected to the unit under test (UUT)
- Shorts testing (test for solder shorts and opens)
- Analog tests (test all analog components for placement and correct value)
- Test for defective open pins on devices
- Test for capacitor orientation defects
- Power up UUT
- Powered analog (test for correct operation of analog components such as regulators and opamps)
- Powered digital (test the operation of digital components and Boundary scan devices)
- JTAG boundary scan tests
- Flash memory, EEPROM, and other device programming
- Discharging capacitors as UUT is powered down

While in-circuit testers are typically limited to testing the above devices, it is possible to add additional hardware to the test fixture to allow different solutions to be implemented. Such additional hardware includes:

- Cameras to test for presence and correct orientation of components
- Photodetectors to test for LED color and intensity
- External timer counter modules to test very high frequencies (over 50 MHz) crystals and oscillators
- Signal waveform analysis, e.g. slew rate measurement, envelope curve etc.
- External equipment can be used for hi-voltage measurement (more than 100Vdc due to limitation of voltage that is provided) or AC equipment source those have interface to PC as the ICT controller
- Bead probe technology to access small traces that cannot be accessed by traditional means

== Limitations ==
While in-circuit test is a very powerful tool for testing PCBs, it has these limitations:

- Parallel components can often only be tested as one component if the components are of the same type (i.e. two resistors); though different components in parallel may be testable using a sequence of different tests - e.g. a DC voltage measurement versus a measurement of AC injection current at a node.
- Electrolytic components can be tested for polarity only in specific configurations (e.g. if not parallel connected to power rails) or with a specific sensor
- The quality of electrical contacts can not be tested unless extra test points and/or a dedicated extra cable harness are provided.
- It is only as good as the design of the PCB. If no test access has been provided by the PCB designer then some tests will not be possible. See design for test guidelines.

== Related technologies ==
The following are related technologies and are also used in electronic production to test for the correct operation of electronics printed circuit boards:

- PCB electrical test of bare PCBs
- AXI automated x-ray inspection
- JTAG Joint Test Action Group (boundary scan technology)
- AOI automated optical inspection
- Functional testing (see Acceptance testing and FCT)
