= Bed of nails tester =

Electronic test fixture used for in-circuit testing

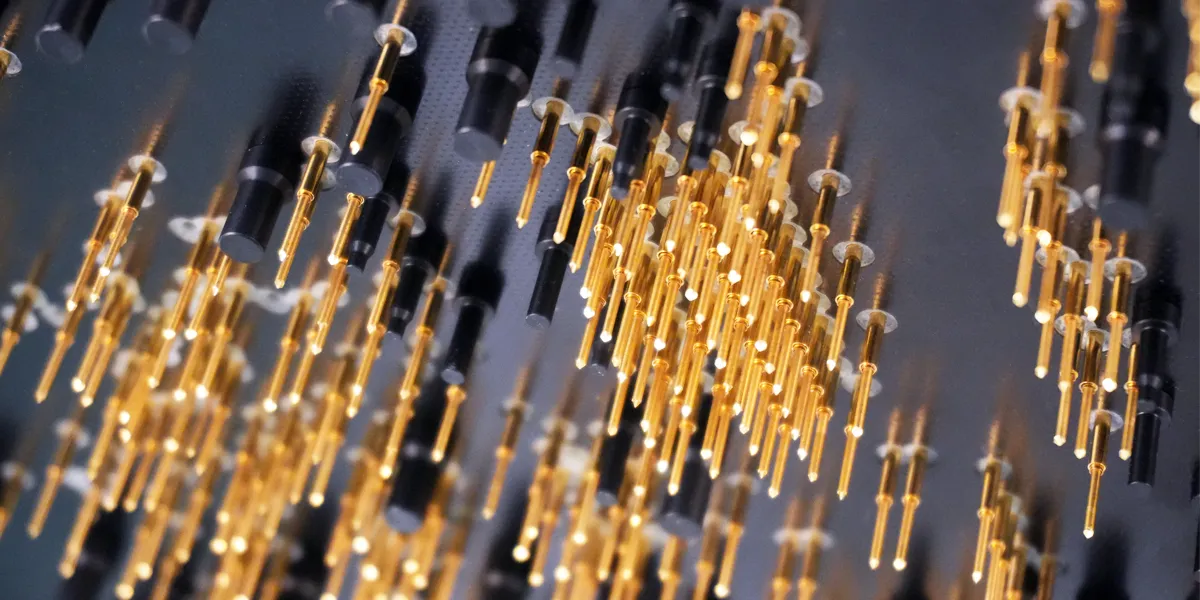
Close up of a test fixture

Spring loaded pins are a component of the bed of nails tester

A bed of nails tester is a traditional electronic test fixture used for in-circuit testing. It has pins inserted into holes in an epoxy phenolic glass cloth laminated sheet (G-10) which are aligned using tooling pins to make contact with test points on a printed circuit board and are also connected to a measuring unit by wires. Named by analogy with a real-world bed of nails, these devices contain an array of small, spring-loaded pogo pins; each pogo pin makes contact with one node in the circuitry of the device under test (DUT). By pressing the DUT down against the bed of nails, reliable contact can be quickly and simultaneously made with hundreds or even thousands of individual test points within the circuitry of the DUT. The hold-down force may be provided manually or by means of a vacuum or a mechanical presser, thus pulling the DUT downwards onto the nails.

Devices that have been tested on a bed of nails tester may show evidence of this after the process: small dimples (from the sharp tips of the Pogo pins) can often be seen on many of the soldered connections of the PCB.

Bed of nails fixtures require a mechanical assembly to hold the PCB in place. Fixtures can hold the PCB with either a vacuum or pressing down from the top of the PCB. Vacuum fixtures give better signal reading versus the press-down type. On the other hand, vacuum fixtures are expensive because of their high manufacturing complexity. Moreover, vacuum fixtures cannot be used on bed-of-nails systems that are used in automated production lines, where the board is automatically loaded to the tester by a handling mechanism.

The bed of nails or fixture, as generally termed, is used together with an in-circuit tester. Fixtures with a grid of 0.8 mm for small nails and test point diameter 0.6 mm are theoretically possible without using special constructions. But in mass production, test point diameters of 1.0 mm or higher are normally used to minimise contact failures, leading to lower remachining costs.

This technique of testing PCBs is being slowly superseded by boundary scan techniques (silicon test nails), automated optical inspection, and built-in self-test, due to shrinking product sizes and lack of space on PCB's for test pads. Nevertheless, bed-of-nails ICT is used in mass production to detect failures before doing end-of-line test and producing scrap.

== ICT failures and mechanical simulation ==
Bed-of-nails testing has been known to cause mechanical failures such as capacitor flex cracking and pad cratering. This typically occurs if there is excessive board flexure due to poor support placement or high probe forces. It can be challenging to optimize for ideal support locations and probe forces without spending resources designing and building an ICT fixture. Current methods typically employ strain gaging or similar techniques to monitor board flexure. More recently, some have looked at finite element simulation to proactively design or adjust an ICT fixture to avoid these mechanical failure modes. This approach can be implemented as part of a design for manufacturability methodology to provide rapid feedback on ICT design and reduce costs.
