= Essential Phone =

2017 Android smartphone by Essential Products

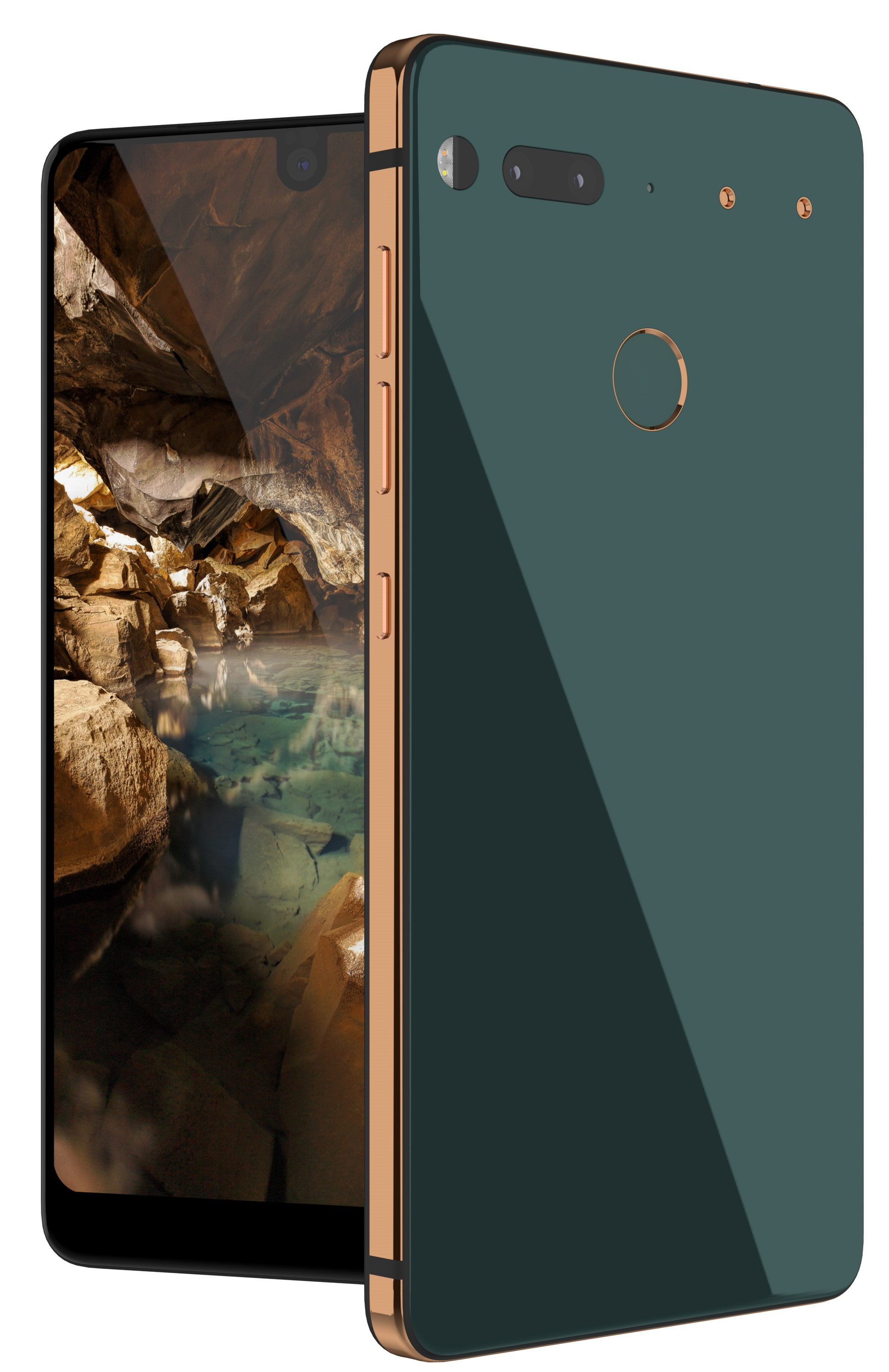
- Developer: Essential Products
- Manufacturer: Essential Products
- Type: Smartphone
- Availability by region: August 25, 2017: United States; Late 2017: Canada; April 27, 2018: France Germany Spain Japan United Kingdom
- Discontinued: December 28, 2018
- Successor: Essential PH-2 (Cancelled)
- Compatible networks: UMTS/HSPA+: 1, 2, 4, 5, 6, 8 GSM: 850, 900, 1800, 1900 MHz; CDMA EV-DO Rev. A: 0, 1, 10; LTE-FDD: 1, 2, 3, 4, 5, 7, 8, 11, 12, 13, 17, 20, 21, 25, 26, 28, 29, 30, 66; LTE-TDD: 38, 39, 40, 41, 42, 43; TD-SCDMA: 34, 39
- Form factor: Slate
- Dimensions: 141.5 mm (5.57 in) H 71.1 mm (2.80 in) W 7.8 mm (0.31 in) D
- Weight: 185 g (6.5 oz)
- Operating system: Original: Android 7.1.1 "Nougat"; Current: Android 10
- System-on-chip: Qualcomm Snapdragon 835
- CPU: Octa-core (4x2.32 GHz & 4x1.9 GHz) Kryo 280
- GPU: Adreno 540
- Memory: 4 GB RAM
- Storage: 128 GB UFS 2.1
- Battery: 3,040 mAh, not user-replaceable
- Rear camera: 13 MP dual RGB + monochrome cameras each with f/1.85 lens, hybrid autofocus combining contrast, phase detect and IR laser, video at 4K 30fps, 1080p 60fps or 720p 120fps
- Front camera: 8 MP resolution with 16:9 aspect ratio, f/2.2 fixed hyperfocal lens, video at 4K 30fps, 1080p 60fps or 720p 120fps
- Display: 5.71 inches (14.5 cm) 2560 x 1312 QHD, 500 cd/m² brightness, 19.5:10 aspect ratio
- Connectivity: Bluetooth 5 LE; Wi-Fi: 802.11a/b/g/n/ac with MIMO; NFC, GPS and GLONASS; USB-C
- Other: Titanium body Ceramic back Corning Gorilla Glass 5 cover glass Rear-mounted fingerprint scanner Modular pogo pins that transmit power for accessories connected over Wireless USB
- Website: essential.com

The Essential Phone (officially Phone or PH-1) is a discontinued Android-based smartphone designed by Android co-founder Andy Rubin, and manufactured, developed and marketed by Essential Products. The phone was announced on May 30, 2017, and released on August 17, 2017.

The Essential Phone has a titanium and ceramic body, an edge-to-edge display protected by Gorilla Glass 5, and two rear cameras, one of which is dedicated to black-and-white photography. Accompanying the phone is a 360-degree camera that can be attached to the top of the device. It was also the first mainstream smartphone to feature a "notch" (the cut-out at the top of the display to accommodate a front-facing camera), which would eventually become a trend in the industry. On December 28, 2018, Essential announced to media outlets that they would discontinue the Essential PH-1.

On February 12, 2020, the company announced it would be winding down with no further updates to the PH-1.

== History ==
=== Pre-release ===
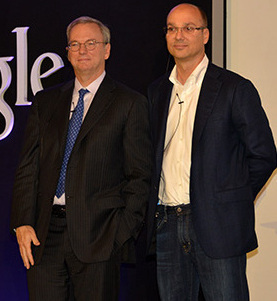
Eric Schmidt and Andy Rubin

Bloomberg reported in January 2017 that Andy Rubin, co-founder of the Android operating system acquired by Google in 2005, was preparing to announce a new hardware company called Essential, whose first hardware product would be the "Essential" Phone.

The phone first appeared in a tweet by Rubin, posted on March 27, 2017. In a quote of the tweet, Alphabet executive chairman Eric Schmidt confirmed the phone would run Android. A few days prior to the official announcement, Essential tweeted an image of what appeared to be a 360-degree camera attached to the smartphone. The Verge exclusively announced the device on May 30, 2017, hours ahead of Rubin's onstage announcement at a technology conference.

== Specifications ==
=== Hardware ===
The Essential Phone has a titanium and ceramic chassis, an edge-to-edge display with an unusual 19.5:10 aspect ratio protected with Gorilla Glass 5, a Snapdragon 835 processor, 4 GB of RAM, and 128 GB of storage.

=== Colors ===
At launch, four color options were announced: "Black Moon" (black ceramic and black titanium trim), "Stellar Grey" (gray ceramic and black trim), "Pure White" (white ceramic and natural titanium trim), and "Ocean Depths" (teal ceramic and copper-colored titanium). "Black Moon" was the first color available, followed by "Pure White" in October 2017.

"Stellar Grey" and "Ocean Depths" were released as limited editions in February 2018, alongside a "Copper Black" variant. "Ocean Depths" sold out within two weeks. An Amazon-exclusive version of the Essential Phone was also launched that month with a "Halo Grey" color and Alexa built-in.

Essential Phone PH-1 color combinations
Name	Ceramic (Note: Color of ceramic back)	Trim (Note: Color of titanium band/frame)	Availability	Released
Black Moon	Gloss Black	Black	Regular	Aug 2017 (Note: Only color available at launch)
Pure White	Gloss White	Natural	Regular	Oct 2017
Stellar Grey	Matte gray	Black	Limited	Feb 2018
Ocean Depths	Gloss teal	Copper	Limited	Feb 2018
Copper Black	Gloss black	Copper	Limited	Feb 2018
Halo Grey	Matte gray	Natural	Regular (Note: Sold exclusively through Amazon)	Feb 2018

=== Cameras ===
Schematic view of screen, including notch for front-facing camera

The primary rear-facing camera uses two 13 MP (4224×3136px) Sony IMX258 Exmor RS sensors, each equipped with f=3.4mm f/1.85 lenses. One sensor is monochrome which omits the Bayer filter to provide luminance data for black-and-white photography. Testing shows the monochrome sensor also improves detail reproduction in low light. The IMX258 is a 1/3.06" 4:3 aspect ratio backside illumination stacked image sensor, which provides an 82° angle of view on the diagonal.

Its front-facing camera has an 8 MP (16:9 aspect ratio, 3840×2160px) sensor with a f=3.1mm f/2.2 lens.

=== Connectors ===
It has a USB-C connector but no 3.5 mm headphone jack. Several Essential-branded accessories were planned for release.

The phone is also equipped with the Click Connector, which uses magnets to secure a modular accessory to the top rear surface of the phone; two gold-plated pogo pins provide power to the accessory, and the phone communicates with the accessory via wireless USB. The Verge compared the Click Connector to the Moto Mods system used on the Moto Z line of smartphones. The first modular accessory designed and launched with the phone is a 360° camera. Also at launch, a charging dock accessory was announced for the same connector. Keyssa announced a lawsuit over the technology used in the Click Connector in October 2017. Essential had discussed wireless data connectivity with Keyssa for several months under a non-disclosure agreement, but Essential opted instead to use hardware from a competitor, SiBEAM. For more discussion on the Keyssa lawsuit, see § Trade secret lawsuit.

In January 2018, Essential announced the development of the Audio Adapter HD, a third Click Connector accessory providing a headphone jack, external DAC, and amplifier. It was scheduled to ship in the summer of 2018. After it went on sale on November 13, 2018, as a limited edition, Essential sold out of the Audio Adapter HD within a day.

=== Network compatibility ===
The Essential Phone is compatible with the four largest wireless carriers in the United States, but the exclusive carrier partner is Sprint. In Canada, Telus is the exclusive carrier partner.

In July 2017, it was reported Essential was planning to sell the Essential Phone in other markets, including the United Kingdom, with a possible partnership with EE, Japan, and Europe.

Bands
CDMA EV-DO Rev. A (CDMA band number)	GSM (MHz)	UMTS (UTRA band number)	LTE-FDD (E-UTRA band number)	LTE-TDD (E-UTRA band number)	TD-SCDMA (E-UTRA band number)
0, 1, 10	850/900/1800/1900	1, 2, 4–6, 8	1–8, 11–13, 17, 20, 21, 25, 26, 28–39, 66	38–43	34, 39

=== Software ===
Essential Phone runs Android, without modifications. It has an unlocked bootloader, potentially allowing for a significant developer community wanting to further customize its software. Rubin published a blog post on August 16, 2017, promising two years of Android updates and three years of monthly security patches. On August 6, 2018, the device was upgraded to Android 9.0 "Pie", day-and-date with its official launch on the first-party Google Pixel devices. An update to Android 10 was also released upon its public availability in September 2019. degoogled ROMs can bring the phone up to Android 15 and include CrDroid, lineageOS, LineageOS with microG, and CarbonROM (Android 11).

== Issues ==
=== Meltdown and Spectre ===
In January 2018, the phone quickly received a patch to fix the Meltdown and Spectre vulnerabilities after they were revealed. Until this time, only phones by Google had these vulnerabilities patched.

=== Availability delay ===
Rubin announced on May 30, 2017, that the Essential Phone would ship in approximately 30 days, i.e. June 2017. This estimated timetable was not met, however, without Essential responding to media queries. In mid-July, Rubin sent an email to potential customers saying carrier certification and testing were underway, and that he expected the device to be shipped "in a few weeks". After a series of delays and the lack of an exact release date, Best Buy put up listings for the Essential Phone, which went live on August 17. On August 9, 2017, Rubin announced the phone was in mass production, and that a release date would be announced in the next week. The Essential Phone was then confirmed to start shipping by the fourth week of August, according to an email sent by Rubin to customers. It began shipping in batches by August 25.

=== Customer data leak ===
On August 29, 2017, reports emerged that hundreds of customers who ordered the Essential Phone started receiving e-mails from an @essential address. The e-mail contained an official-looking request for a "photo ID" of the customer to "verify information to complete the processing of the recent order". Essential later tweeted that they were aware of the recent e-mails received by some customers and that they were investigating them and had taken steps to mitigate problems. Rubin personally apologized and one year of LifeLock was offered to affected customers; around 70 people were affected. Some customers' drivers' licenses were leaked over e-mail as well. Customers affected by the data leak got the phone for free.

=== Touch issues ===
In October 2017, some handsets had a display touch scrolling "jitteriness" issue. Essential said they were working on the problem and a software patch would be released.

=== Trade secret lawsuit ===
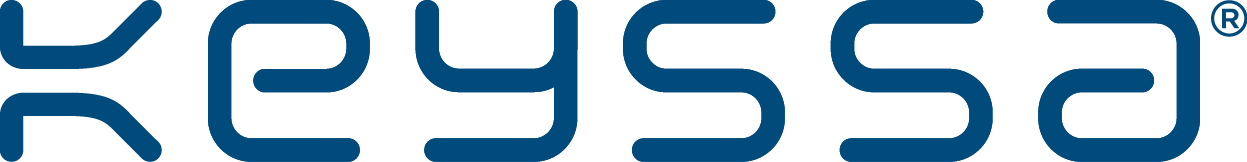
Keyssa (now owned by Molex) filed a lawsuit against Essential in October 2017.

Keyssa, a startup company founded by Dr. Frank Chang, Ira Deyhimy and Gary McCormack and specializing in wireless data transmission, filed a lawsuit accusing Essential of trade secret theft in October 2017. Keyssa said it was in talks with Essential for roughly 10 months to help provide the technology behind connecting Essential's new Android phone and their planned future products. Essential wanted to incorporate a Keyssa-developed microchip in the Essential Phone to provide functionality to their modular accessories, but turned to a similar company, SiBeam, to produce the microchip. Keyssa says Essential stole its proprietary technology because the non-disclosure agreements it signed protected the two companies' meetings and prevented Essential from using those trade secrets to make commercial products.

Keyssa has not been compensated for Essential's use of this guidance and know-how. We are pursuing this action because our attempts to resolve this matter through discussions with Essential have not been successful.

— Keyssa

According to Essential, the Click Connector is not based on technology from Keyssa and the firm vowed to "defend ourselves vigorously".

== Reception ==
=== Critical reception ===
The Essential Phone received generally positive reviews. Much of the criticism was directed towards the camera performance, and the omission of a headphone jack.

- Wired positively noted its design, battery life, performance and stock Android OS, but disliked the camera and built-in speaker. They gave it a score of 8/10.
- Engadget praised its build quality, edge-to-edge display, performance, battery life and clean build of Android 7.1.1, but criticized the screen's brightness, and the lack of a headphone jack and water resistance.
- iFixit gave the phone a 1 out of 10 in terms of repairability because it is almost impossible to open without freezing and ultimately breaking it.
- CNET noted that despite Essential's claims about the device's toughness, it can still suffer from dents during normal use, and the screen may crack if dropped from a height.
- This Week in Tech praised the design, specs, and OS, but noted the phone's screen cracked during normal use without being dropped, and criticized the performance of the cameras and a camera accessory.
- Tech reviewer Marques Brownlee gave the phone an award for "Best Design" in his annual "Smartphone Awards" series in 2017.

=== Sales ===
In its first month of release, shipments of the Essential Phone were very low, with sales of around 5,000 units estimated being sold through Sprint. Due to low demand, Essential reduced the price of the phone from an initial US$699 to US$499. Customers who purchased the phone at the original price could claim a US$200 "friends and family" code that could be used to purchase the 360-degree camera module or another Essential Phone.

Essential claim six figure sales numbers, estimated to be about 150,000 phones.

== Successor ==
The PH-2, a successor that was in the works according to designers has been cancelled. According to sources at Essential in October 2018, the company was working on another phone that operates primarily under voice control to automate certain tasks, such as responding to emails and text messages or making appointments.

On October 9, 2019, Essential founder Andy Rubin shared Project Gem which was planned to be the company's upcoming smartphone. The images shared by Rubin showed an abnormally tall smartphone running on Android. On February 12, 2020, as part of their announcement regarding ceasing operations, Essential showcased videos of the phone and stated they had, "taken Gem as far as we can and regrettably have no clear path to deliver it to customers."

In 2021, the british consumer electronics company Nothing bought the brand.
