= Smart fixture =

A smart fixture is an advanced test fixture which combines a fixture with sensors to collect data and provide feedback. They are a subset of cyber-physical systems. Sensors and/or instrumentation embedded in the fixture are connected to a programmable logic controller or computer which apply algorithms to determine if required criteria are met i.e. functional testing.

A smart fixture can be a manufacturing fixture or simply a test fixture. The smart aspect is fully realised in the use of the data collected via IIoT/ Industry 4.0. machine learning, artificial intelligence and other big data tools can be applied to perform real time analysis and predictive decision making to improve operational efficiencies.

== Electronics ==
Circuit boards, are held in place and subjected to controlled electronic test signals.

Examples of fixtures:

- Uploading a software into a microcontroller and testing the functionality of the PCBA
- Checking the correct parameters of a LED light

== See also ==
- Device under test
- Bed of nails tester
