= Moto Z2 Play =

Android smartphone developed by Motorola Mobility

- Brand: Moto
- Manufacturer: Motorola Mobility
- Type: Phablet
- First released: June 2017
- Predecessor: Moto Z Play; Moto Z
- Successor: Moto Z3; Moto Z3 Play
- Form factor: Slate
- Dimensions: 156.2 mm (6.15 in) H 76.2 mm (3.00 in) W 6 mm (0.24 in) D
- Weight: 145 g (5.1 oz)
- Operating system: Original: Android 7.1.1 "Nougat"; Current: Android 9.0 "Pie"
- System-on-chip: Qualcomm Snapdragon 626
- CPU: Octa-core ARM 2.2 GHz
- GPU: Adreno 506
- Memory: 3 GB or 4 GB
- Storage: 32 GB or 64 GB
- Removable storage: microSD up to 256 GB
- Battery: 3000 mAh Li-ion
- Rear camera: 12 MP with laser-assisted autofocus, dual-LED flash, f/1.7 aperture, BSI; 720p 120 fps, 1080p 60 fps, and 4K 30 fps video recording
- Front camera: 5 MP, f/2.2 aperture, flash
- Display: 5.5 in (140 mm) Super AMOLED; 1920 × 1080 (16:9 aspect ratio, 401 ppi)
- Connectivity: List: Wi-Fi; Wi-Fi Direct; Wi-Fi hotspot; DLNA; GPS/GLONASS; NFC; Bluetooth; USB-C
- Codename: albus

Moto Z2 Play is an Android phablet smartphone developed by Motorola Mobility, as the successor to 2016's Moto Z Play. As with other smartphones in the Moto Z series, it supports Motorola's magnetically attachable "MotoMods" modules.

== Specifications ==
=== Hardware ===
The Z2 Play features a Qualcomm Snapdragon 626 system-on-chip, backed by 3 or 4 GB of RAM. It comes with either 32 or 64 GB storage, with microSD expansion. The phone does not have much design changes from its predecessor, to be able to have successful compatibility with previous Moto Mods, as Motorola promised. Some notable changes include a metal backplate, instead of the glass back used previously, a slight reduction in thickness (−1 mm), and change of the shape of the home button from square to oval to enhance your experience with the device, with the built-in “Moto” app, which can enable “one button navigation”. The handset comes with a 1080p AMOLED display. It does not have an IP (International Protection) dust and water resistance rating, but does have a 3.5 mm headphone jack and an internal FM radio. The camera department has been improved as well, sporting a 12 MP sensor with f/1.7 aperture, but lacks OIS.

=== Software ===
It comes with Android 7.1.1 “Nougat”, with a few software tweaks. It is possible to upgrade the phone to Android 8.0.0 “Oreo” or Android 9.0 “Pie” with an update.

== Reception ==
CNET noted its strong battery life, clever software and magnetic Moto Mod add-ons as the Motorola Z2 Play's main strengths, while also saying that it felt uncomfortable without a cover and complained about poorer battery life as compared to its predecessor.

Pocket-lint praised its battery life, fingerprint sensor's gesture controls and the processor's smoothness, but they also felt that the OnePlus 5 gives a better run for money and that not all MotoMods fit perfectly.
