= Moto Z3 =

Android smartphone developed by Motorola Mobility

- Brand: Moto
- Manufacturer: Motorola Mobility
- Type: Phablet
- First released: August 2018
- Predecessor: Moto Z2 Play; Moto Z2 Force Edition
- Successor: Moto Z4
- Form factor: Slate
- Dimensions: H: 156.5 mm (6.16 in) W: 76.5 mm (3.01 in) D: 6.75 mm (0.266 in)
- Weight: 156 g (5.5 oz)
- Operating system: Original: Android 8.1 "Oreo"; Current: Android 9.0 "Pie"
- CPU: Qualcomm Snapdragon 835
- GPU: Adreno 540
- Memory: 4 GB
- Storage: 64 GB
- Removable storage: microSD up to 2 TB
- Battery: Non-removable 3000 mAh Li-ion
- Rear camera: 12 MP, f/2.0 aperture, 1.25 μm + 12 MP monochrome, Laser Autofocus (pDAF), Color Correlated Temperature (CCT) dual LED flash, Zero Shutter Lag (ZSL). Video capture Up to 4K 30 fps, 1080p 60 fps
- Front camera: 8 MP, f/2.0 aperture, 1.12 μm, wide-angle 84° lens, screen flash Video capture 1080p 30 fps
- Display: 6.01 in (153 mm) Super AMOLED 2160 × 1080 (18:9 aspect ratio, 402 ppi)
- Connectivity: List: Wi-Fi; Wi-Fi Direct; Wi-Fi hotspot; DLNA; GPS/GLONASS/BDS; NFC; Bluetooth; USB-C

The Moto Z3 (stylized as Moto z³ by Motorola and not to be confused with the Moto Z3 Play) is an Android smartphone developed by Motorola Mobility, as the successor to the Moto Z2 Force Edition. It is the world's first 5G-upgradable smartphone. Like all of Motorola's smartphones in the Moto Z series, it supports Motorola's magnetically attachable "MotoMods" modules.

== Specifications ==
=== Hardware ===
The Moto Z3 is 76.5 mm wide, 156.5 mm long and 6.75 mm thick, with a polished aluminum frame, a glass rear and a 2.5d glass front. The back of the Moto Z contains pogo pin connectors used to communicate with "MotoMod" accessories designed for the device. The phone features a 6.01-inch (153 mm) 2160 × 1080 OLED screen, a Qualcomm Snapdragon 835 CPU, 4 GB of RAM, and 64 GB of storage, with microSD expansion up to 2 TB. Moto Z3 utilizes a USB-C connector, and does not include a 3.5 mm headphone jack, headphones must be used with a USB port adapter or over Bluetooth. Unlike the previous Z2, the Z3 lacks an internal FM Radio receiver. The phone is Splash-resistant p2i.

The phone has an 8 MP front facing wide-angle (84°) camera, f/2.0 aperture, 1.12 μm with screen flash. The front camera is capable of up to 1080p 30 fps video capture.

Dual 12 MP rear cameras f/2.0 aperture, 1.25 μm capable of up to 4K (3840 × 2160) at 30 fps video capture.

=== Software ===
The phone was released with the Android Oreo 8.1.0. It can be upgraded to Android 9.0 (Pie).

=== Accessories ===
The Moto Z features an accessory system known as "Moto Mods". Mods are case-like accessories that are attached to the rear of the Moto Z via a series of magnets. Using the pogo pin connectors, Mods can communicate with the device to provide additional functionality. Mods are hot swappable, and are automatically detected by the operating system software once installed. Motorola provides a relatively wide array of these "Moto Mods" in various departments such as photography and entertainment.

However, there are reports that indicated Motorola's diminished interest in its MotoMods modular concept, which was initially expected to give the flagship Motorola phones edge in a highly competitive Android market. This is attributed to a recent move on the part of the company to scale back on its partnership with third-party MotoMod makers. The company also confirmed previously reported layoffs, which was acknowledged to have affected less than two percent of its global workforce.

== Reception ==
TechRadar noted the phone's "stylish design" and primarily its 5G up-gradable feature. On the contrary, it noted that the "Snapdragon 835 chip is outdated".

A TechRadar review also stated, "The Moto Z3 won't turn heads with its simple design and lack of flagship features, but it's a surprisingly powerful phone at a bargain price. Which would be enough to recommend the phone – but it's also Verizon's secret weapon to get folks in the 5G door at a lower cost by buying the Z3 and a 5G Moto Mod. But how it will perform on the network has yet to be seen."

DigitalTrends said, "The Moto Z3 brings strong performance, an all-day battery, and an affordable price tag. The potential of 5G aside, it’s the best option for Verizon subscribers looking for a sub-$500 phone." "If you’re on Verizon looking for a mid-range smartphone, you’ll be satisfied with the Moto Z3. The 5G Moto Mod is nice, but it shouldn’t be the primary attraction for buying this phone, since it’s so limited in availability."
