= Circuit Check =

American test equipment manufacturer

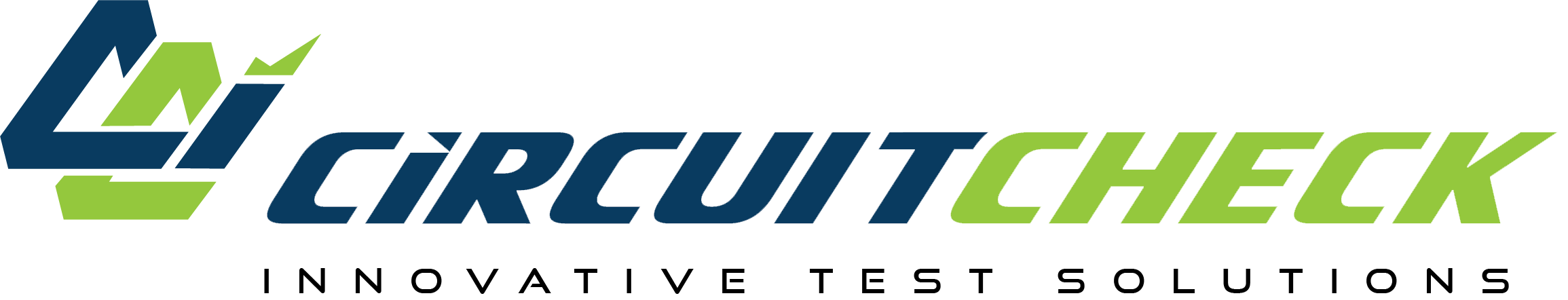
- Company type: Private Company
- Founded: 1978
- Headquarters: Maple Grove, Minnesota; United States
- Number of locations: 6
- Key people: Chris Scorse (CEO)
- Products: test fixture, automatic test equipment
- Number of employees: 225+ (worldwide)
- Website: www.circuitcheck.com

Circuit Check is an American company with about 225 employees and seven direct operations in six countries (the U.S., Canada, Mexico, United Kingdom, China, and Malaysia). Headquartered in Maple Grove, Minnesota, it is one of the largest manufacturers of electronic and mechanical test fixtures in North America, . The company also manufactures Automatic Test Equipment for end-of-line manufacturing test. The company uses either a Microsoft Excel-driven "CCITest" software platform, or the National Instruments LabVIEW software platform. They have a variety of clients in different industries which include: Automotive, Military & Aerospace, Medical, Industrial, and Computer Networking.

== History ==
Circuit Check was founded in 1978 as a spin-out of a printed circuit board drilling service bureau, "CircuitDrill." The initial product was test fixtures for bed of nails testers.

Over the following years, the company developed innovations for in-circuit test and functional test or FCT. One, the pneumatically actuated "clamshell" test fixture, electrically probes a circuit board from both sides.

The company also combined in-circuit test with functional test in the same test fixture in 2004, by developing (and patenting) the two-stage fixture having pins of two different lengths, and compressing to two different heights.

== Milestones ==
The company devised a method for applying strain gage testing to determining the stresses placed on circuit boards by the hundreds or thousands of test probes used to make electrical contact therewith. This is useful because each test probe (a.k.a. "pogo pin") exerts several ounces of force on the device under test (DUT). When the test fixture has thousands of test probes, the sum of the individual probe forces can reach hundreds of pounds. Such force is sufficient to deform the DUT (a printed circuit board, for example) to the point where the attached inflexible electronic component packages (such as Ball Grid Arrays) may fracture, or their solder joints may fail. Strain gage testing can reveal areas on the DUT where these net forces are excessive when the DUT is clamped into the test fixture, thus showing where supports must be added to the opposite side of the test fixture to counteract the test probe forces. Where a support counteracts the test probe forces, the test probe force is converted from a deformative force distorting the DUT to a compressive force, squeezing the DUT circuit board without deforming its generally planar shape.
