= Moto Z4 =

Android smartphone developed by Motorola Mobility

- Brand: Moto
- Manufacturer: Motorola Mobility
- Type: Phablet
- First released: June 2019
- Predecessor: Moto Z3
- Form factor: Slate
- Dimensions: H: 158 mm (6.2 in) W: 75 mm (3.0 in) D: 7.4 mm (0.29 in)
- Weight: 165 g (5.8 oz)
- Operating system: Original: Android 9 "Pie"; Current: Android 10
- System-on-chip: Qualcomm Snapdragon 675
- GPU: Adreno 612
- Memory: 4 GB
- Storage: 128 GB
- Removable storage: microSD up to 1 TB
- Battery: Non-removable 3600 mAh Li-ion
- Rear camera: 48 MP, ƒ/1.7aperture, 1/2", 0.8um, PDAF, OIS, dual LED flash, panorama, HDR Video capture Up to 4K(30 fps), 1080p@30/60fps
- Front camera: 25 MP, ƒ/2.0 aperture, 0.9um, screen flash, HDR Video capture 1080p (30 fps)
- Display: 6.4 in (160 mm) OLED; 2340 × 1080 px (19.5:9 aspect ratio) (403 ppi)
- Connectivity: List: Wi-Fi; Wi-Fi Direct; Wi-Fi hotspot; DLNA; GPS/GLONASS/BDS; NFC; Bluetooth; USB-C; 3.5mm headphone jack
- Model: XT1980

The Moto Z4 (stylized as Moto z⁴ by Motorola) is an Android phablet developed by Motorola Mobility, as the successor to the Moto Z3 and Moto Z3 Play. It was released in May 2019, and made available in June. It is compatible with Moto Mods.

== Specifications ==
=== Hardware ===
The SD675 SOC is much closer to the SD636 from the Moto Z3 Play than the SD835 from the Moto Z3. Benchmarks from CNET shows it beating the Moto Z3 Play, roughly tieing the Pixel 3A and losing to the Moto Z3 and OnePlus 6T.

The front and rear cameras were upgraded compared to the previous models. The rear camera goes from two 12MP to a single 48MP. The front camera goes from 12MP to 25MP.

The battery is upsized from the 3000mAh found on the Moto Z3 to 3600mAh.

The 3.5mm headphone jack is reintroduced after being absent on the Moto Z3.

== Reception ==
CNET scored it a 7 out of 10 while stating "As a budget phone, the Moto Z4 doesn't beat the similarly priced Pixel 3a XL or OnePlus 6T."
