= Newton (software) =

Cross-platform e-mail application

- Screenshot The recap screen on the Newton app, displayed on an iPhone X.
- Developers: CloudMagic, Inc.
- Operating system: iOS, Android, Windows, ChromeOS, macOS
- Available in: Arabic, Dutch, English, French, Hebrew, Indonesian, Italian, Japanese, Korean, Polish, Portuguese, Romanian, Russian, Simplified Chinese, Spanish, Swedish, Thai, Traditional Chinese
- Type: Email client
- License: Proprietary (Software as a service)
- Website: newtonhq.com

Newton (originally CloudMagic) was an email management application for iOS, Android, MacOS, Windows and ChromeOS developed by CloudMagic, Inc. The application was known for its searching capabilities, cross-platform abilities and user interface. It has been referred to as an email client better than Gmail's native app. As of September 15, 2016, CloudMagic had been renamed to Newton Mail with premium services, adding a host of new features and functions.

On August 7, 2018, it was announced that Newton would shut down effective September 25, 2018.

Newton was reopened on February 5, 2019, after being acquired by Essential Products. On February 12, 2020, Essential announced they were shutting down, including Newton's services. Newton would continue to run until April 30, 2020, after which point it would shut down as well. However, Newton Mail said on their website that they had identified an anonymous partner who could possibly keep Newton running after the closing date of April 30, 2020.

On May 13, 2020, Simform and SoFriendly announced the acquisition and relaunch of Newton Mail.

On July 24, 2024, it was announced that Newton would shut down effective July 31, 2024. 50 % of prorated refunds will be provided to paid users and all user data will be deleted.

On June 29, 2026, a blog post titled "The calm inbox returns: Newton in 2026" appeared on the company website, detailing a rebuild of the application from the ground up on a lighter, desktop-first architecture for macOS and Windows. The post, credited to the "Pixer team", stated that the rewrite eliminated the costly centralized server infrastructure that the authors said had contributed to the app's repeated shutdowns, with the client instead connecting directly to users' accounts. At the time of the announcement the rebuilt version supported only Gmail, Outlook and Microsoft 365; the desktop clients were available for download, while mobile applications were described as still in development. The app's App Store listing, published under the developer name CloudMagic, Inc., stated that planned additions for 2026 included AI features, Model Context Protocol (MCP) support, and email collaboration.

== Features ==
CloudMagic, as the application was originally known, provided support for Gmail, Hotmail, Yahoo! Mail, Outlook.com, iCloud, Google Apps, Microsoft Exchange, Office 365, Mail.com, GMX, AOL and IMAP accounts. It ran on all iOS devices running iOS 8 and above, and Android devices running Android 4.0 and above. The application was one of the first apps on ChromeOS when Google decided to bring Android apps to Chromebook.

In March 2014, CloudMagic announced Cards, a feature that connects popular services like Evernote, Pocket, Trello, Asana, Microsoft OneNote, Salesforce.com, Zendesk and integrates them with the app. Cards made it easier for users to complete their workflow without leaving their email. It was also one of the first apps to support Android Wear when it was announced in Google I/O, June 2014.

In January 2015, CloudMagic launched a "Pro" subscription service ($9.99 monthly; $99.99 yearly) to allow more than five mail accounts to be added, preference and configuration sync, among other features. The Pro subscription was discontinued in April of the same year. In April 2016, CloudMagic partially reintroduced premium services by introducing Sender Profile, then on September 14, 2016, renamed CloudMagic to Newton and fully introduced a subscription fee, initially at an introductory rate until July 2018, when the price are adjusted to be at the same rate as the 2015 Pro subscription. The change was met with negative responses from users.

In December 2018, Essential Products acquired CloudMagic.

== Reception ==
Newton has received positive reviews.

Newton for Mac was considered by some to be the best mail clients on Mac, with praise focused on the consistent emailing experience on desktop and its distraction-free design. In April 2014, Newton won the Webby Awards People's Voice for "Best Visual Design - Function". In September 2014, Newton won the "Best Design" award at the Evernote Platform Awards. Newton was also praised by Really Good Emails for using plain-text email to improve user engagement.
