= Essential Products =

American technology company

Essential Products Inc.
- Type: Private
- Industry: Technology
- Founded: November 9, 2015; 11 years ago
- Founders: Andy Rubin; Matt Hershenson
- Defunct: February 12, 2020; 6 years ago
- Fate: Dissolved
- Successor: Nothing (in-name-only)
- Headquarters: 380 Portage Avenue, Palo Alto, CA 94306, US
- Key people: Niccolo De Masi (president and chief operating officer)
- Products: Essential Phone; Essential Home
- Number of employees: ~100
- Parent: Nothing
- Website: www.essential.com (archive)

Essential Products (marketed as Essential) was an American technology company and manufacturer founded on November 9, 2015, by Andy Rubin and based in Palo Alto. The company developed, manufactured, and sold Essential Phone and accessories for it, including 360 Camera for Essential Phone. The company closed on February 12, 2020, stating that it was developing a new handset, but that there was "no clear path to deliver it to customers".

== History ==
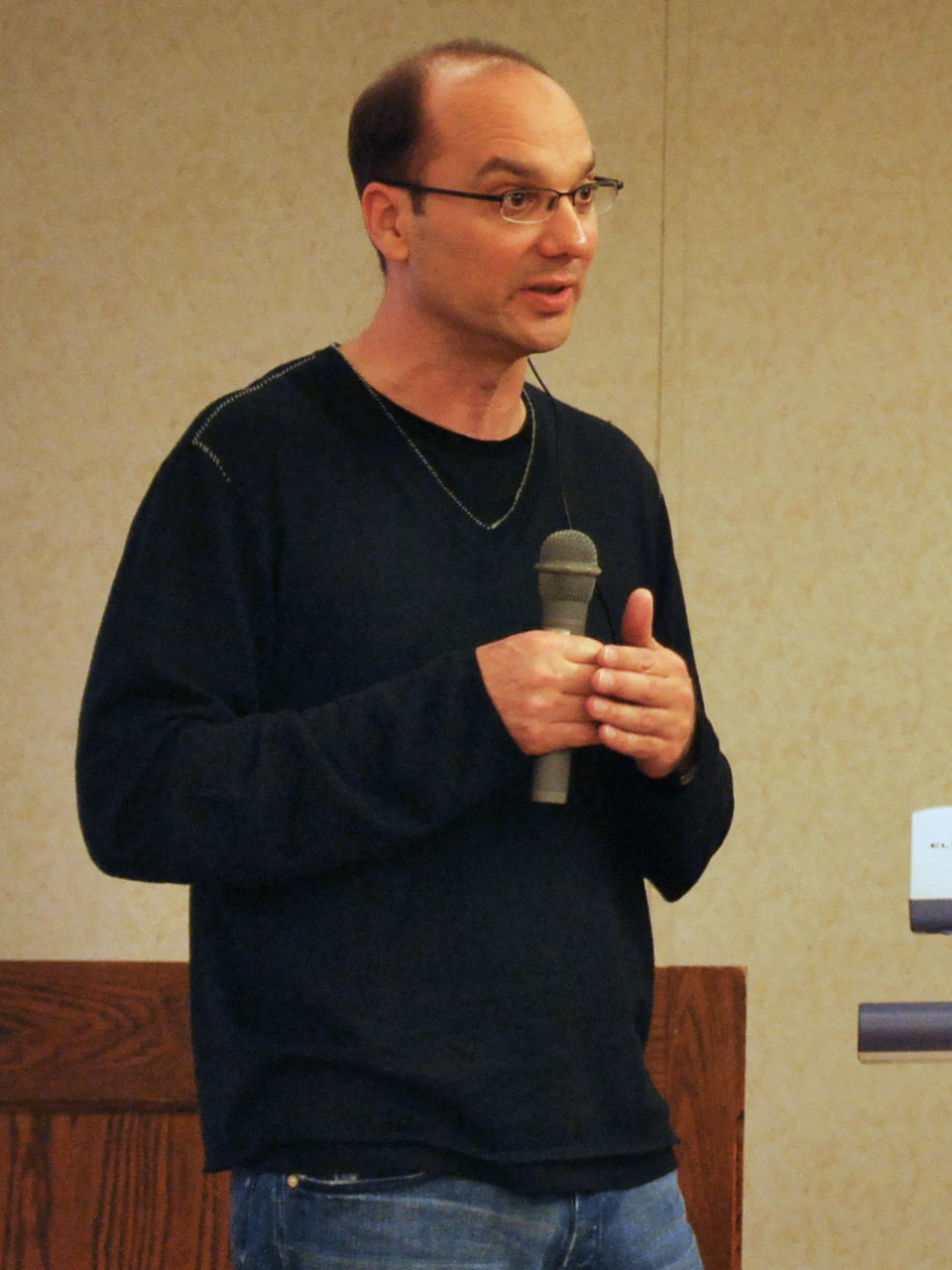
Andy Rubin, the founder of Essential

The company was established in Palo Alto on November 9, 2015, by Android co-founder Andy Rubin, with funding from Playground Global. In December 2016, Brian Wallace, who left his occupation as chief marketing officer for Magic Leap a month prior, was reportedly working with Rubin. Trademarks with the 'Essential' brand name were also filed with the United States Patent and Trademark Office that same month.

In January 2017, it was reported that the new company was planning to unofficially reveal a smartphone. In March, Rubin released an image that teased the unannounced smartphone on his Twitter account. On May 25, the company teased a second image of the smartphone on its Twitter account. On May 30, the company announced both the smartphone, dubbed the Essential Phone, and its smart speaker, Essential Home.

In August 2017, it was reported that Amazon, Tencent and Foxconn have invested in Essential Products.

In August 2017, the company was valued as a unicorn.

On May 25, 2018, the company cancelled its next flagship and was reported to be for sale.

In December 2018, Essential acquired CloudMagic, owner of the mobile email app Newton.

In October 2019, Essential teased an upcoming replacement for the PH-1 called the 'Gem'. This device would have a much more slender form factor than its predecessor, would rely mostly on voice control, and would utilize advanced AI for processing the voice control input.

But, the new product never hit the market, as on February 12, 2020, the company announced that it was ceasing operations because there was "no clear way to deliver ['Gem'] to customers".

On February 17, 2021, the brand was bought by Carl Pei's Nothing Start up.

== Products ==
=== Essential Phone ===
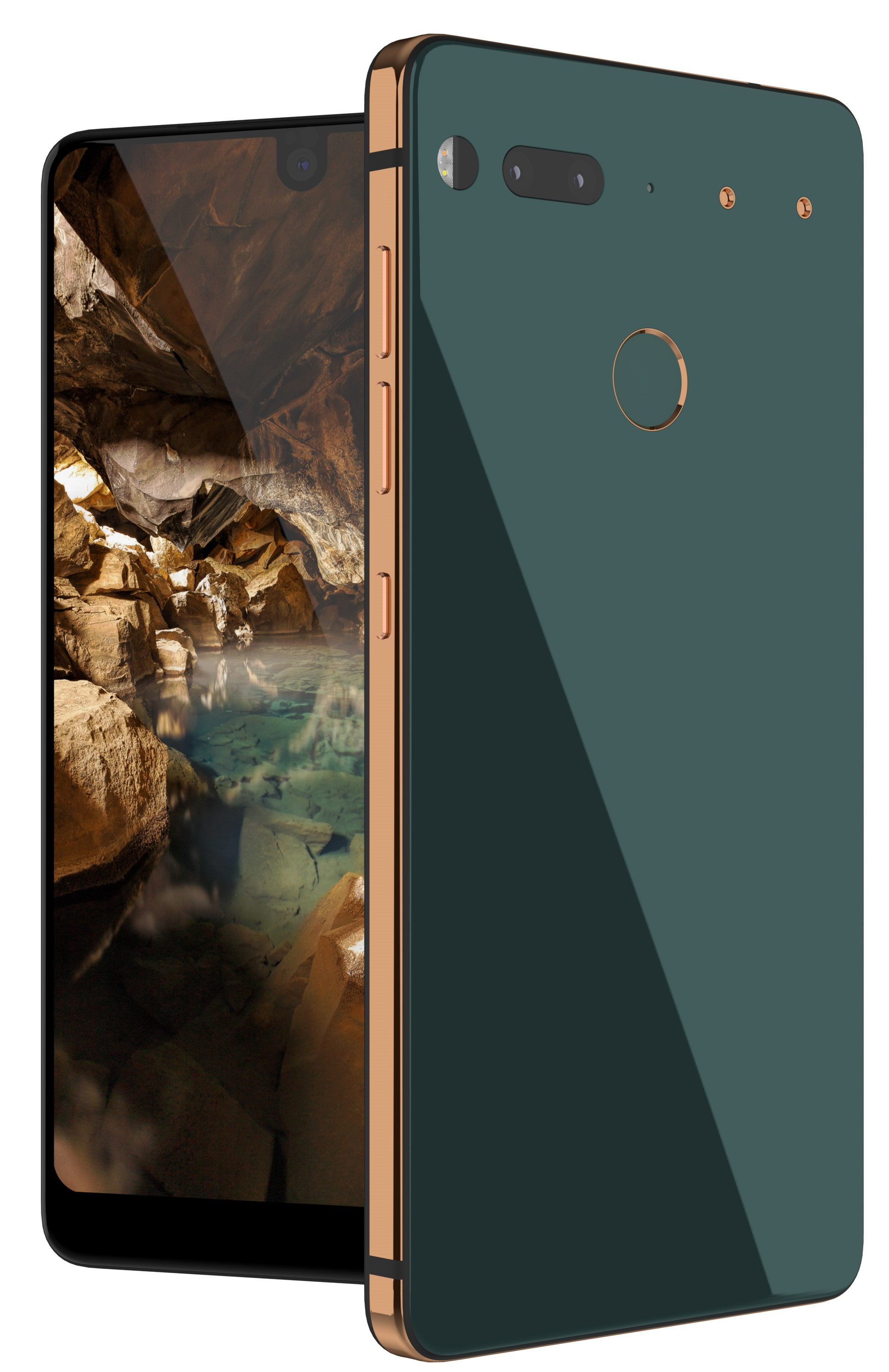
The Essential Phone in "ocean depths" colour

The Essential Phone is a phone introduced in 2017. The device is upgradable to Android 10, and was only sold in the United States and Canada. The device will not receive any software updates, including security patches, after February 3, 2020, due to the company going out of business.

=== Newton Mail ===
In early 2019 Essential Products acquired CloudMagic, Inc., developers of the Newton Mail app, which shut down in September 2018. Newton Mail restored services shortly after being acquired. Newton shut down on April 30, 2020.

=== Undelivered Products ===
Project GEM was a prototype of a second phone developed by Essential Products Inc. It was announced in a company blog post on October 9, 2019 and cancelled three months later, on February 12, 2020, in coincidence with the shutdown of Essential.

Essential Home was a planned smart speaker and smart home hub running an Essential-designed operating system, named "Ambient OS". The device launch was planned for late 2017, however it never arrived on the market.
