= Moto Z Play =

2016 modular smartphone

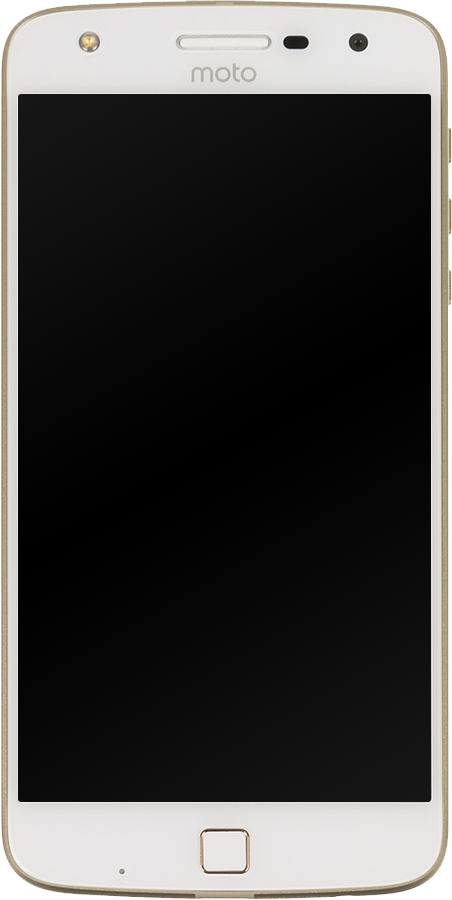

Moto Z Play is an Android smartphone developed by Motorola Mobility. Unveiled in August 2016 at IFA Berlin, it is a mid-range version of the Moto Z, distinguished primarily by its larger battery (thus making it a de facto successor to the Moto X Play, a similarly-positioned counterpart to the company's 2015 flagship, the Moto X Style). As with the Moto Z, the Z Play is compatible with "MotoMods" accessories that can be magnetically attached to the device to provide additional functionality.

== Specifications ==
The Moto Z Play's chassis utilizes a metal frame and body; it is thicker than the flagship Moto Z model, at 6.99 mm (0.275 in), and includes a USB-C connector and a 3.5 mm headphone jack. The rear of the device contains pogo pin connectors used to communicate with "MotoMod" accessories. The Moto Z Play includes a 5.5-inch (140 mm) 1080p display, an octa-core Qualcomm Snapdragon 625 system-on-chip, and 3 GB of RAM. The Moto Z Play includes 32 GB of internal storage, expandable via MicroSDXC card, a 16-megapixel rear-facing camera, a 5-megapixel front-facing camera, and a fingerprint scanner.

== Reception ==
CNET noted that the Z Play had advantages over the more expensive Moto Z, including a bigger battery and a headphone jack, although the Z Play was thicker and heavier, and the fingerprint sensor was once again criticized for looking too much like a home button. The camera was considered to be "altogether satisfactory for quick, casual shots", with fewer white balance issues than the Moto Z, but grainy low-light shots. In a test of "mild" real-world use, the device's battery lasted four days on a single charge. While judged as being slower in tests than the competing Alcatel Idol 4S and OnePlus 3, it was felt that the Moto Z's performance was "enough to satisfy your common phone needs", and was not sluggish in launching apps and performing common tasks. In conclusion, it was felt that the Moto Z Play was "an affordable phone with an impressively enduring battery life."
