= Moto Z3 Play =

Android smartphone developed by Motorola Mobility

- Brand: Moto
- Manufacturer: Motorola Mobility
- Type: Phablet
- First released: August 2018
- Predecessor: Moto Z2 Play
- Form factor: Slate
- Dimensions: H: 156.5 mm (6.16 in) W: 76.5 mm (3.01 in) D: 6.75 mm (0.266 in)
- Weight: 156 g (5.5 oz)
- Operating system: Original: Android 8.1 "Oreo"; Current: Android 9.0 "Pie"
- CPU: Qualcomm Snapdragon 636
- GPU: Adreno 509
- Memory: 4 GB or 6 GB
- Storage: 32 GB up to 128 GB
- Removable storage: microSD up to 2 TB
- Battery: Non-removable 3000 mAh Li-ion
- Rear camera: 12 MP, f/2.0 aperture, 1.25 μm + 5 MP monochrome, Laser Autofocus (pDAF), Color Correlated Temperature (CCT) dual LED flash, Zero Shutter Lag (ZSL). Video capture Up to 4K 30 fps, 1080p 60 fps
- Front camera: 8 MP, f/2.0 aperture, 1.12 μm, wide-angle 84° lens, screen flash Video capture 1080p 30 fps
- Display: 6.01 in (153 mm) Super AMOLED 2160 × 1080 (18:9 aspect ratio, 402 ppi)
- Connectivity: List: Wi-Fi; Wi-Fi Direct; Wi-Fi hotspot; DLNA; GPS/GLONASS/BDS; NFC; Bluetooth; USB-C

The Moto Z3 Play (stylized as Moto z³ Play by Motorola) is an Android smartphone developed by Motorola Mobility, as the successor to the Moto Z2 Play. It shares most of its features with the Moto Z3, but uses a SD636 SOC instead of a SD835.

== Reception ==
The phones features were generally liked. Its high price compared to competitors was cited as its major weakness.
