= Fuzz button =

Electrical connection material

A Fuzz Button is a high performance electrical connection material used to connect two parts of an electrical circuit together, for example an IC to a PCB or two PCBs to each other. Fuzz Buttons consist of a single strand of gold-plated beryllium copper wire compressed into a dense, sponge-like cylindrical shape. Their diameter can range from a few tenths of a millimetre to a millimetre.

The term "Fuzz Button" was originally conceived and trademarked by Tecknit, but is now owned by a Denver-based company called Custom Interconnects.

== Practical uses ==
This kind of connection is used in cases where permanent connection techniques like soldering or non-permanent ones like pogo pins or elastomeric "Zebra" connectors are not suitable, for example due to extreme vibrations or temperatures. They can also be used where low-distortion signal transmission is needed, like on PCB (board-to-board) interconnects, or in IC testing sockets where additionally many mating cycles are required. They can be used discretely as a signal/ground contact or for Electromagnetic interference (EMI) protection. When a mating array for multiple contacts is needed, like for BGA or LGA IC packages, Fuzz Buttons can be placed in thru-holes in an insulated piece of material, such as dielectric plastic.

Fuzz Buttons are commonly utilized in satellite and space applications, but are also broadly used in military and commercial applications.

== See also ==
- Pogo pin
