= Moto Z =

Android smartphone developed by Motorola Mobility

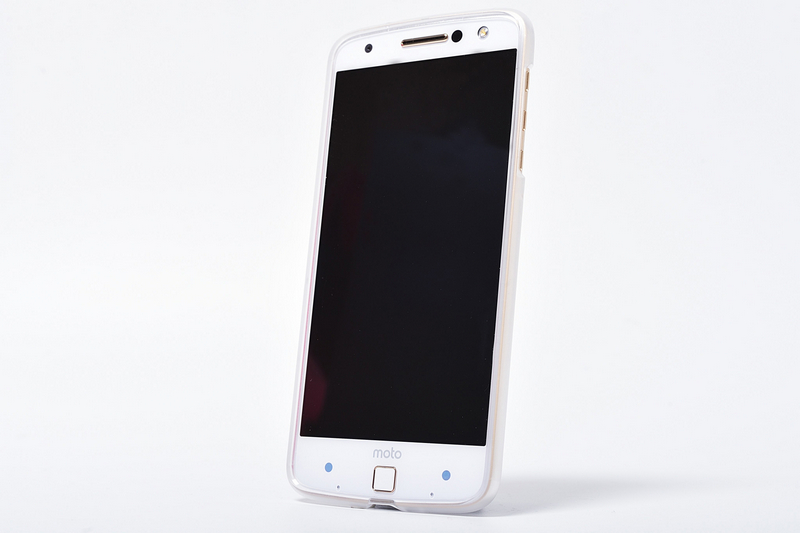
- Brand: Moto
- Manufacturer: Motorola Mobility
- Type: Phablet
- First released: September 2016
- Successor: Moto Z2 Play; Moto Z2 Force Edition
- Form factor: Slate
- Dimensions: 153.5 mm (6.04 in) H 75.3 mm (2.96 in) W 5.19 mm (0.204 in) D
- Weight: 136 g (4.8 oz)
- Operating system: Original: Android 6.0.1 "Marshmallow"; Current: Android 8.0 "Oreo"
- System-on-chip: Qualcomm Snapdragon 820
- CPU: Quad-core ARM 64-bit 2.2 GHz
- GPU: Adreno 530
- Memory: 4 GB LPDDR4 RAM
- Storage: 32 GB or 64 GB
- Removable storage: microSD up to 2 TB
- Battery: 2600 mAh Li-ion
- Rear camera: 13 MP with laser-assisted autofocus, dual-LED flash, ƒ/1.8 aperture, optical image stabilization, BSI; 1080p 60 fps, and 4K 30 fps video recording
- Front camera: 5 MP, ƒ/2.2 aperture, flash
- Display: 5.5 in (140 mm) AMOLED; 2560 × 1440 pixels (16:9 aspect ratio) (535 ppi); 2.5D Corning Gorilla Glass 4.0
- Connectivity: List: Wi-Fi; Wi-Fi Direct; Wi-Fi hotspot; DLNA; GPS/GLONASS; NFC; Bluetooth; USB-C; Moto Mods connector
- Data inputs: List: Accelerometer; Gyroscope; fingerprint sensor; Magnetometer; Hall effect
- Website: Official website

Moto Z is an Android phablet smartphone developed by Motorola Mobility. Unveiled on June 9, 2016, as its flagship model for the year, the Moto Z is distinguished by the "Moto Mods" technosystem which allows case accessories to be magnetically attached to the device to provide additional functionality. The Moto Z was later joined by the more rugged Moto Z Force of which shares most of the same internals as the former, and the mid-range Moto Z Play with downgraded specifications, all three devices being compatible with the modular system.

In the United States, Moto Z is carrier-exclusive to Verizon Wireless under the name Moto Z Droid Edition, as part of the Droid line of smartphones that are exclusively manufactured by Motorola. It was released direct-to-consumer as an unlocked device in September 2016. The phone was the final one to carry the Droid branding, as Verizon discontinued it after its release.

The Moto Z, Moto Z Force, and Moto Z Play were succeeded by the Moto Z2 Force and Moto Z2 Play which retain compatibility with the modular system.

== Specifications ==
The regular Moto Z chassis uses a metal frame and body; with no accessories installed, the device is only 5.2 mm thick. The rear contains pogo pin connectors used to communicate with "MotoMod" accessories designed for the device. The Moto Z includes a 5.5-inch 1440p display, a quad core Qualcomm Snapdragon 820 system-on-chip, and 4 GB of RAM. The Moto Z includes either 32 or 64 GiB of internal storage, expandable via MicroSDXC card, a 13-megapixel rear-facing camera, a 5-megapixel front-facing camera, and a fingerprint scanner. The Moto Z uses a USB-C connector, and does not include a 3.5 mm headphone jack; headphones must be used with a USB port adapter or over Bluetooth. The phone houses the cs47L35 hifi dac as opposed to some speculations of inbuilt aquistic dac.

There is also a rugged variant known as the Moto Z Force which shares most of the same internals as the base model. Differences include a larger 3500 mAh battery, 21-megapixel camera, and the company's "shatter-resistant" display, which consists of polycarbonate layers accompanied by an interior frame to provide reinforcement as opposed to glass. Due to this construction, it is also slightly thicker than the base model. The Force model is exclusive to Verizon Wireless.

A third version, Moto Z Play, was unveiled at IFA Berlin; it is a mid-range model with downgraded specifications and similar market positioning to the previous year's Moto X Play, including a Snapdragon 625 system-on-chip, 3 GB of RAM, a 1080p display, no optical image stabilization in the rear camera, and a thicker chassis. Unlike the other models, the Z Play has a 3.5 mm headphone jack. Similarly to the Moto X Play, it also includes a larger, 3510 mAh battery which Motorola promoted as the "longest lasting battery" that the company had ever incorporated into a smartphone. As with the other models in its family, it is compatible with MotoMod accessories.

== Accessories ==
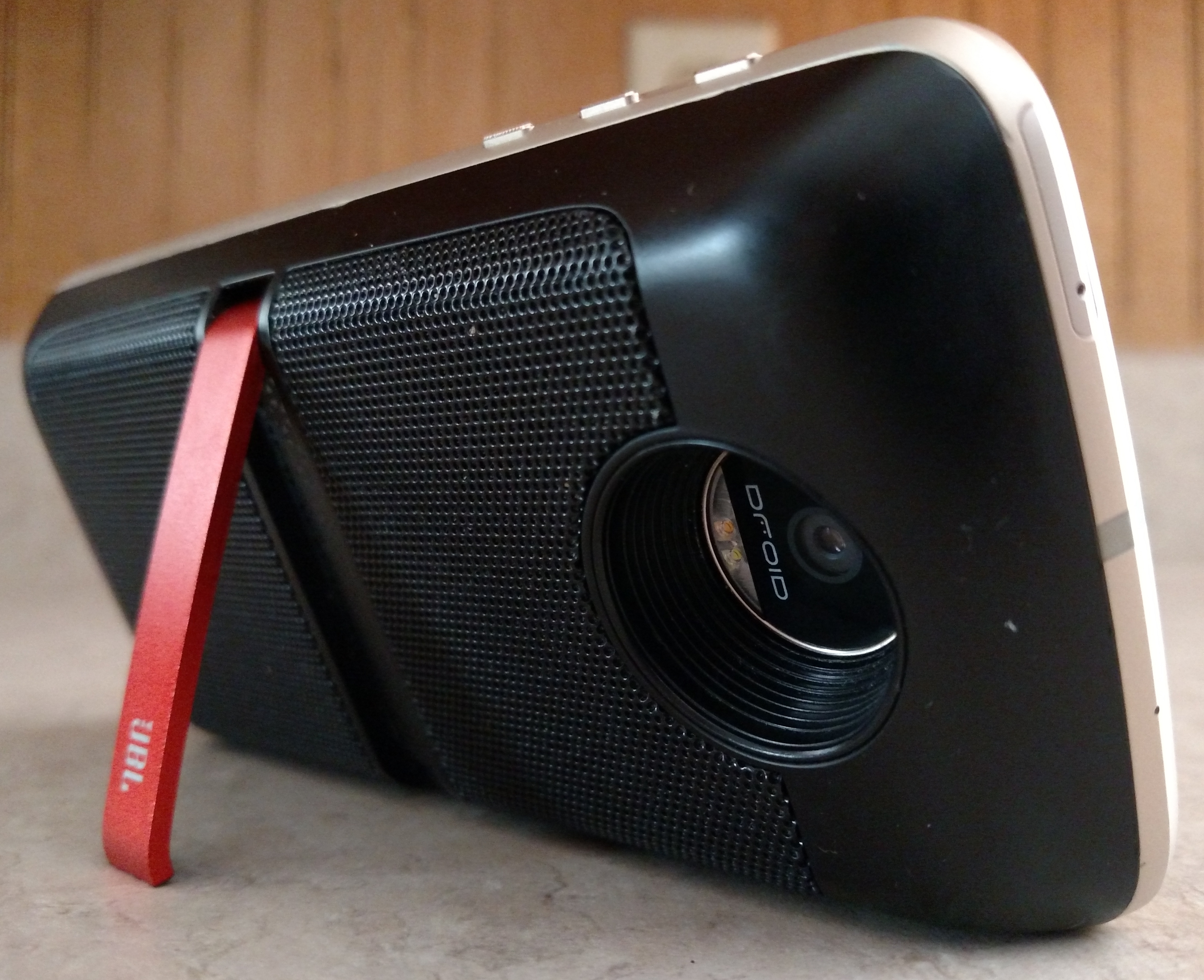
JBL SoundBoost Moto Mod attached to a white Moto Z Force

The Moto Z features an accessory system known as "Moto Mods". Mods are case-like accessories that are attached to the rear of the Moto Z via a series of magnets. Using the pogo pin connectors, Mods can communicate with the device to provide additional functionality. Mods are hot swappable, and are automatically detected by the operating system software once installed. During the launch event, Lenovo unveiled several mods to be available on launch, including battery packs, the "SoundBoost" (which features a JBL speaker and a kickstand), and a pico projector ("Insta-Share"). All Moto Z devices ship with a "Style Shell"—a basic rear cover, as well as a clear, plastic "bumper" case that protects the bezel of the device.

Lenovo will allow third-party development of Mods, and plans to provide US$1 million in funding to the best prototype concept as part of a contest. To ensure that Mods will be backwards compatible with newer revisions of the Moto Z, Lenovo stated that it planned to maintain the device's overall design and dimensions for two hardware generations.

By 2018, there were reports of Motorola's diminished interest in its MotoMods modular concept, which was initially expected to give the flagship Motorola phones edge in a highly competitive Android market. This is attributed to a recent move on the part of the company to scale back on its partnership with third-party MotoMod makers. The company also confirmed previously reported layoffs, which affected less than 2% of its global workforce.

== Reception ==
CNET was positive of the Moto Z, describing its design as being "sturdy and well-built", but appearing "naked" and having a large camera protrusion without an accessory installed. The design and placement of the fingerprint reader was criticized for resembling a physical home button but not being able to be used as one. The Moto Z's performance was considered similar to other devices with the same system-on-chip. In regards to the MotoMods system, it was felt that although the accessories added weight to the device and were expensive, the implementation of the system was less "clunky" than that of the LG G5 (which was unable to hot swap accessories due to its design, which required removing the battery in order to install a different module). The camera was panned for having issues in automatically achieving correct white balance. In conclusion, it was argued that the Moto Z was "a good, if pricey, Android phone that has the same powerful specs and performance as other top-tier rivals for about the same cost", if not for the Moto Z's accessories.

Ars Technica was more critical; while complimenting its design for looking more premium than the previous Moto X, as well as the improved quality of the Z Force's "ShatterShield" display, it was argued that the removal of the headphone jack made the device feel less capable, and further considered its absence from the thicker Moto Z Force to be illogical. The mod system was considered superior in implementation to the G5 due to their ease of use and integration with the device and its software. However, the accessories themselves were criticized for being hampered by their form factor, and having standalone alternatives of a higher quality at more competitive pricing. The standard Moto Z scored poorly on battery testing, while the larger-capacity Moto Z Force performed better on the tests. Although Motorola's continuing practice of lightly enhancing the base Android experience was praised, the company was criticized for having stated that it would not release Android's monthly security patches, indicating a dwindling commitment by Motorola to servicing their devices than under Google ownership. In conclusion, it was argued that despite its competitive hardware, there was "little reason" to buy a Moto Z due to "the lackluster Moto Mods, poor software update policy, a price comparable to rival flagship phones, and the omission of a headphone jack".

The Moto Z design has not been regarded to have aged well, being "introduced prior to the industry's shift to tall, narrow screens and a distaste for vertical bezels" which was pioneered by the Samsung Galaxy S8 and LG G6 released in early 2017. However, Motorola would be stuck with the "design language that it promised to support for three years to ensure multi-generational compatibility with the proliferating Moto Mods technosystem that has become, for better or worse, a burden that the Moto Z line has had to carry on its narrow shoulders".

== See also ==
- Modular smartphone
