= Functional testing (manufacturing) =

Type of quality control test

In manufacturing, Functional Testing (FCT) is performed during the last phase of the production line. This is often referred to as a final quality control test, which is done to ensure that specifications are met by manufacturers.

The process of FCTs entails the emulation or simulation of the environment in which a product is expected to operate. This is done so to check, and correct any issues with functionality. The environment involved with FCTs consists of any device that communicates with an DUT, the power supply of said DUT, and any loads needed to make the DUT function correctly.

Unlike other testing methods, such as visual inspection and component-level electrical checks, Functional Testing runs system-level verification tests. The tests confirm that the PCB has all the correct components in the right places, and that those components work together correctly, under load. Every function that the board is supposed to carry out, can be tested and measured, with the results logged automatically. This gives manufacturers full data set on every board that passes through the line, allowing for full traceability.

Functional tests can be performed in an automatic fashion by production line operators using test software. In order for this to be completed, the software will communicate with any external programmable instruments such as I/O boards, digital multimeters, and communication ports. In conjunction with the test fixture, the software that interfaces with the DUT is what makes it possible for a FCT to be performed.

== Typical vendors ==
- Agilent Technologies
- Keysight
- Circuit Check
- National Instruments
- Teradyne
- Flex (company)
- 6TL engineering
- Moteco GmbH

== See also ==
- Acceptance testing
