= Pogo pin =

Type of electrical connector mechanism

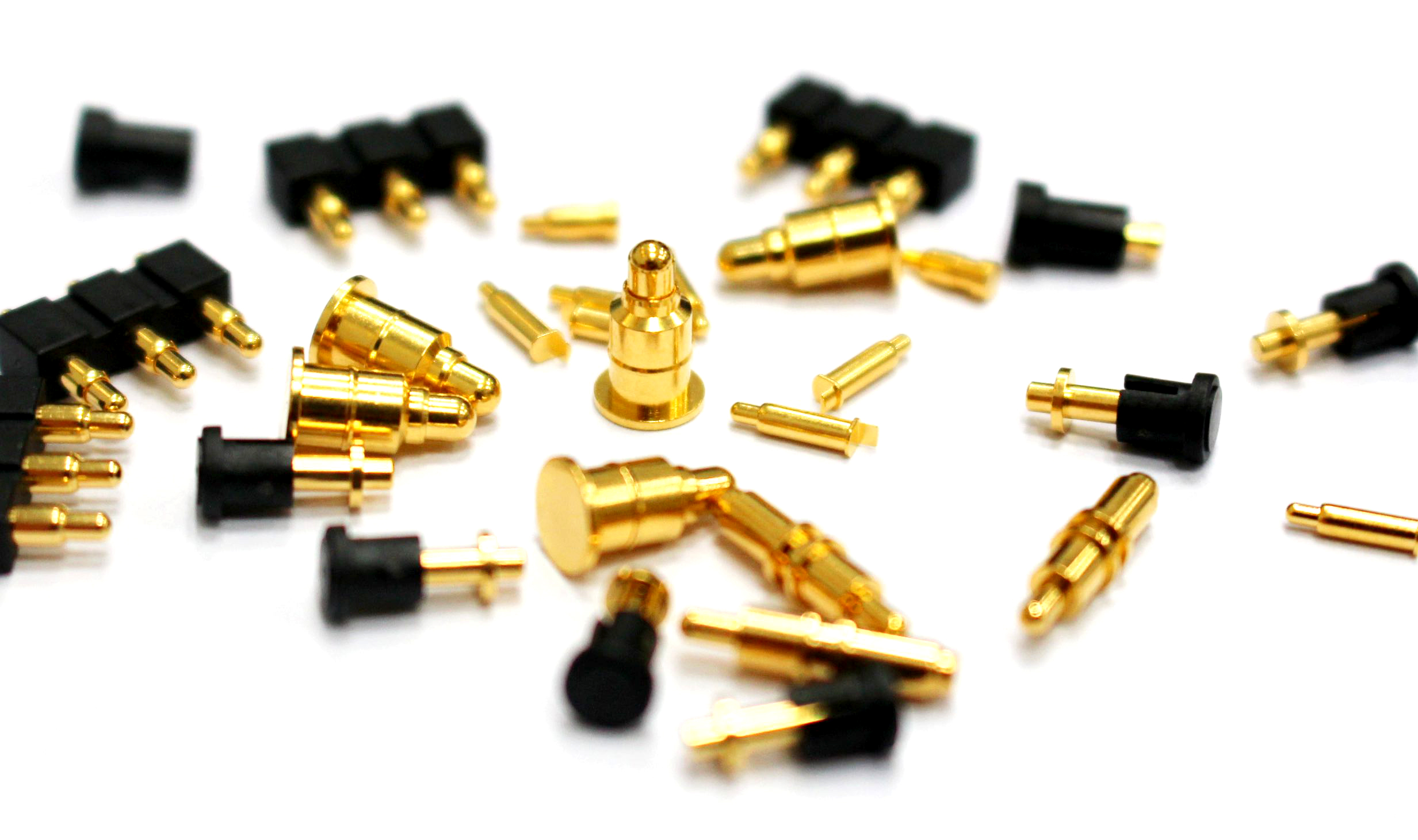
Variety of loose pogo pins and pogo pins in 3-pin assembly holders and with Pick and Place caps

Sectional drawing of a pogo pin, showing the plunger, barrel, and spring

A pogo pin or spring-loaded pin is a type of electrical connector mechanism with spring plungers that is used in many modern electronic applications and in the electronics testing industry. They are used for their improved durability over other electrical contacts, and the resilience of their electrical connection to mechanical shock and vibration.

The name pogo pin comes from the pin's resemblance to a pogo stick – the integrated helical spring in the pin applies a constant normal force against the back of the mating receptacle or contact plate, counteracting any unwanted movement which might otherwise cause an intermittent connection. This helical spring makes pogo pins unique, since most other types of pin mechanisms use a cantilever spring or expansion sleeve.

A complete connection path requires a mating receptacle for the pin to engage, which is termed a target or land. A pogo target consists of a flat or concave metal surface, which unlike the pins, has no moving parts. Targets may be separate components in the complete connector assembly, or in the case of printed circuit boards, simply a plated area of the board.

Spring-loaded pins are precision parts fabricated with a turning and spinning process which does not require a mold, thus allowing the production of smaller quantities at a lower cost.

== Structure ==
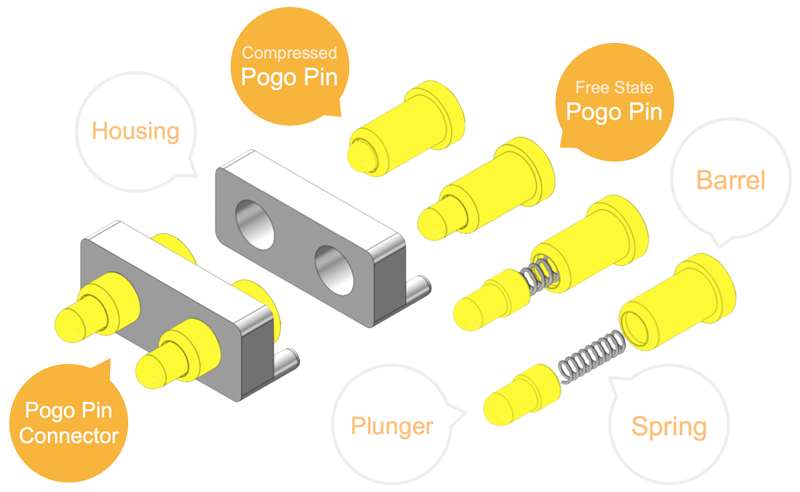
Exploded diagram showing components of a standard pogo pin

A basic spring-loaded pin consists of 3 main parts: a plunger, barrel, and spring. When force is applied to the pin, the spring is compressed and the plunger moves inside the barrel. The shape of the barrel retains the plunger, stopping the spring from pushing it out when the pin is not locked in place.

In the design of electrical contacts, a certain amount of friction is required to hold a connector in place and retain the contact finish. However, high friction is undesirable because it increases stress and wear on the contact springs and housings. Thus, a precise normal force, typically around 1 newton, is required to generate this friction. Since a spring-loaded pin needs to have a slight gap between the plunger and barrel so that it can slide easily, momentary disconnections can happen when there is vibration or movement. In order to counter this, the plunger usually has a small tilt to ensure a continuous connection.

Many manufacturers have created their own proprietary variations on this design, most commonly by varying the interface between the plunger and spring. For example, a ball may be added between the two components, or the plunger may have an angled or countersunk tip.

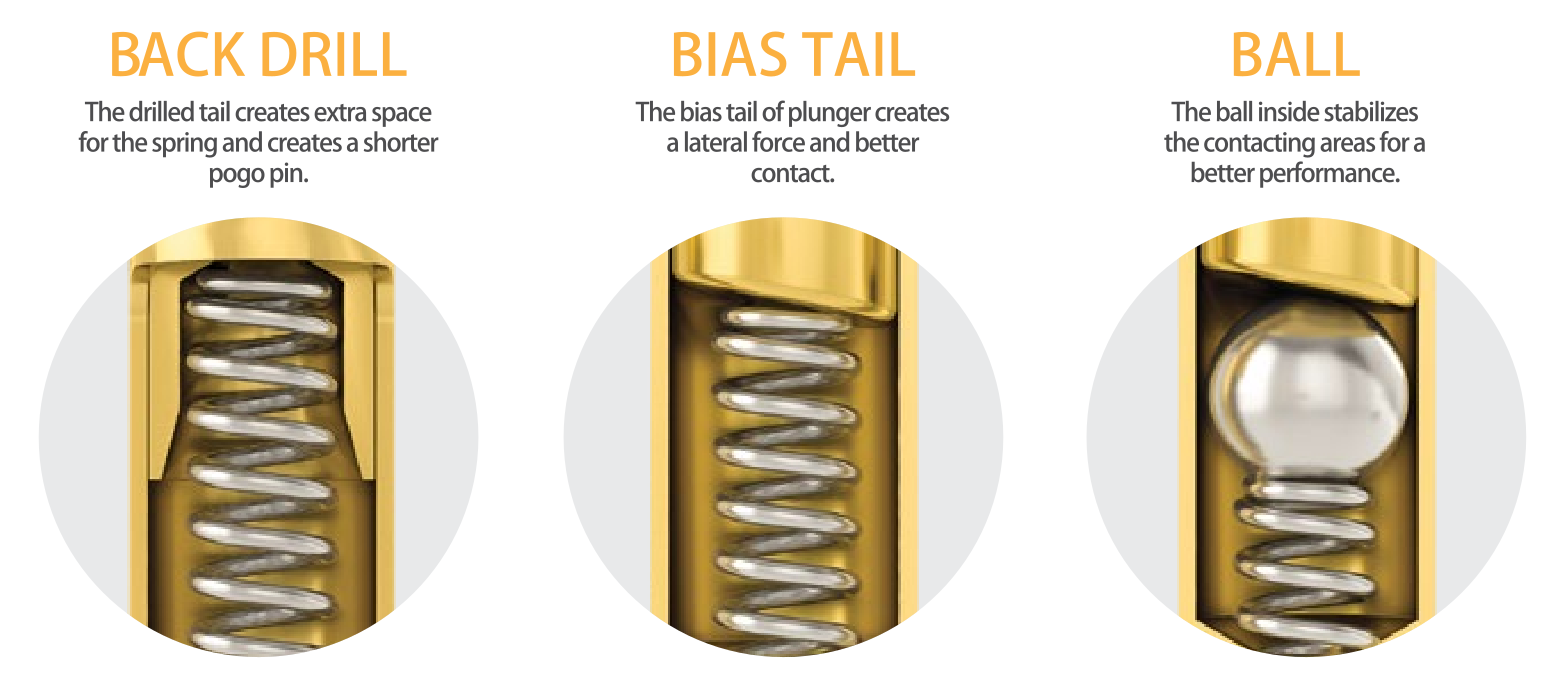
Various pogo pin designs

== Materials ==
The plunger and barrel of pogo pins usually use brass or copper as a base material on which a thin layer of nickel is applied.

As common in electrical connectors, manufacturers often apply a gold plating that improves the durability and contact resistance.

The springs are usually made of copper alloys or spring steel.

== Applications ==
Spring-loaded connectors are used for a wide variety of applications, in both industrial and consumer electronics:

- Board-to-board connectors (usually permanent)
- Ingress-protected connectors in consumer devices, e.g. smart watches, rugged computers
- Battery terminals on laptops
- Magnetic charging or signal connectors, e.g. laptop docks and chargers
- High-frequency connectors, e.g. antennas, monitor connectors
- Printed circuit board testing
- Integrated circuit testing
- Battery testing
- Other electronics testing

=== Connector arrangement ===
When pogo pins are used in a connector, they are usually arranged in a dense array, connecting many individual nodes of two electrical circuits. They are commonly found in automatic test equipment like bed of nails testers, where they facilitate the rapid, reliable connection of the devices under test (DUTs). In one extremely high-density configuration, the array takes the form of a ring containing hundreds or thousands of individual pogo pins; this device is sometimes referred to as a pogo tower.

They can also be used for more permanent connections, for example, in the Cray-2 supercomputer.

When used in the highest-performance applications, pogo pins must be very carefully designed to allow not only high reliability across many mating/unmating cycles but also high-fidelity transmission of the electrical signals. The pins themselves must be hard, yet plated with a substance (such as gold) that provides for reliable contact. Within the body of the pin, the plunger must make good electrical contact with the body lest the higher-resistance spring carry the signal (along with the undesirable inductance that the spring represents). The design of pogo pins to be used in matched-impedance circuits is especially challenging; to maintain the correct characteristic impedance, the pins are sometimes arranged with one signal-carrying pin surrounded by four, five, or six grounded pins.

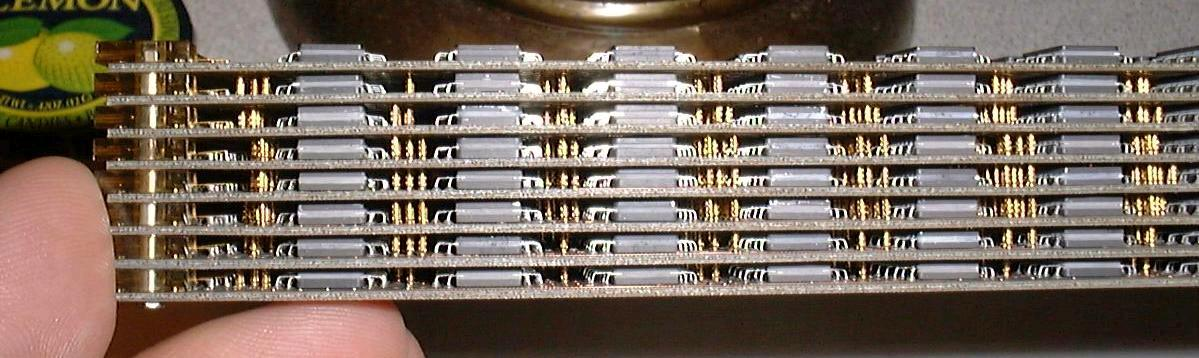
Pogo pins connecting logic modules of the Cray-2 supercomputer

=== Combination with magnets ===
Spring-loaded connectors may be combined with magnets to form a strong and reliable connection – a technique which has been employed extensively for consumer electronics such as 2-in-1 PCs and high-frequency data transfer. One notable example of this is Apple's MagSafe connector.

=== Commercial products ===
Although often used as a generic name, pogo pin is a registered trademark of Everett Charles Technologies (ECT).

== See also ==
- Electrical connector, in which pogo pins are sometimes used
- Jumper (computing), performs a similar function but bridges a circuit between two pins
- In-circuit test, a common application of pogo pins
- Fuzz Button, a high performance electrical connection
