= Nothing Phone 4a/4a Pro =

2025 Android smartphone manufactured by Nothing

Nothing Phone (4a) Nothing Phone (4a) Pro
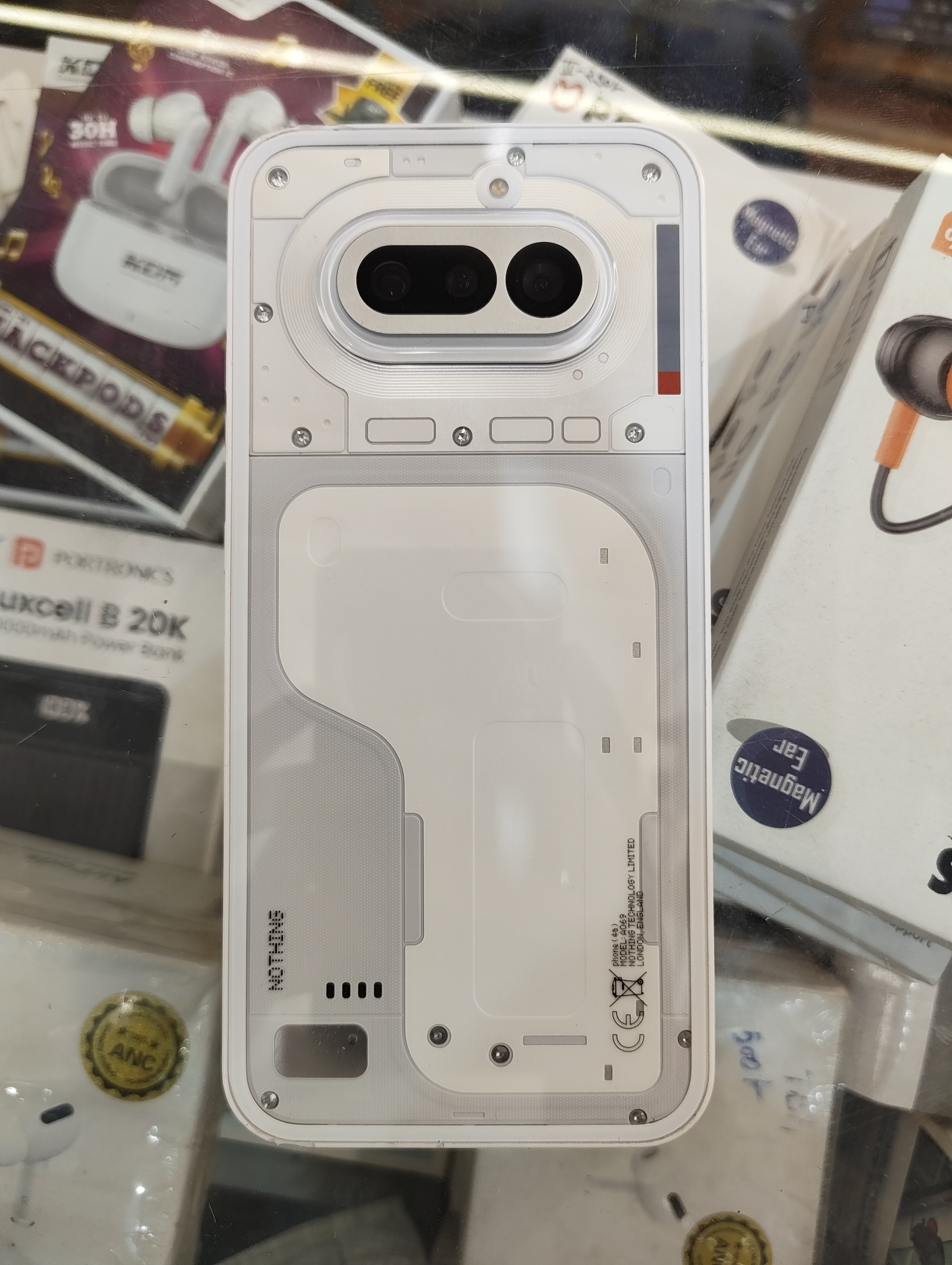
- The back of the Phone (4a)
- Developer: Nothing Technology Limited
- Type: Smartphone
- Series: Phone
- Predecessor: Nothing Phone (3a) / (3a) Pro
- Form factor: Slate
- Colors: Phone (4a): White, black, pink, blue Phone (4a) Pro: Silver, black, pink
- Dimensions: Phone (4a): 164 mm × 77.6 mm × 8.6 mm Phone (4a) Pro: 163.7 mm × 76.6 mm × 8 mm
- Weight: Phone (4a): 204.5 g Phone (4a) Pro: 210 g
- Operating system: Android 16 with Nothing OS 4.1 (3 major Android upgrades and 6 years of security updates)
- System-on-chip: Phone (4a): Qualcomm SM7635-AC Snapdragon 7s Gen 4 Phone (4a) Pro: Qualcomm SM7750-AB Snapdragon 7 Gen 4
- CPU: Octa-core Phone (4a): 1 × 2.7 GHz Cortex‑A720; 3 × 2.4 GHz Cortex‑A720; 4 × 1.8 GHz Cortex‑A520; Phone (4a) Pro: 1 × 2.8 GHz Cortex‑A720; 4 × 2.4 GHz Cortex‑A720; 3 × 1.8 GHz Cortex‑A520
- GPU: Phone (4a): Adreno 810 (895 MHz); Phone (4a) Pro: Adreno 722 (1150 MHz)
- Memory: 8 GB or 12 GB RAM LPDDR4X
- Storage: 128 GB or 256 GB UFS 3.1
- SIM: Dual-SIM (Nano-SIM) eSIM in Pro version
- Battery: Li-ion; 5,080 mAh (international); 5,400 mAh (India)
- Charging: 50W fast charging, 7.5W reverse wired charging
- Rear camera: Phone (4a): 50 MP, f/1.9, 24 mm (wide), 1/1.57", 1.0 µm, PDAF, OIS; Phone (4a) Pro: 50 MP, f/1.9, 24 mm (wide), 1/1.56", 1.0 µm, dual pixel PDAF, OIS; Both variants: 50 MP, f/2.9, 80 mm (periscope telephoto), 1/2.7", 0.64 µm, PDAF, OIS, 3.5x optical zoom 8 MP, f/2.2, 15 mm, 120° (ultrawide), 1/4.0", 1.12 µm
- Front camera: 32 MP, f/2.2, 22 mm (wide), 1/3.42", 0.64 µm
- Display: Flexible AMOLED; HDR10+ 800 nits (typical); 1600 nits (HBM); Phone (4a): 6.78 in, 1224 × 2720, 120 Hz, 4500 nits (peak); Phone (4a) Pro: 6.83 in, 1260 × 2800, 144 Hz, 5000 nits (peak)
- Connectivity: Bluetooth 5.4, Wi-Fi 6, USB-C
- Model: A069, A069P

The Nothing Phone (4a) and Nothing Phone (4a) Pro are Nothing OS–based Android smartphones manufactured by Nothing Technology Limited. Unveiled on 5 March 2026, they succeed the Nothing Phone (3a) / (3a) Pro series.

While both phones have a 3.5x optical zoom, the main differences between the Phone (4a) and Phone (4a) Pro are their main camera sensors and overall periscope telephoto capabilities. The Phone (4a) Pro features a Sony LYT700C sensor and offers up to 140x digital zoom, whereas the standard Phone (4a) utilizes a Samsung ISOCELL GN9 sensor with 70x digital zoom.

== Design ==
The Phone (4a) Pro has a solid aircraft-grade aluminium unibody; only the camera island on the back retains the traditional see-through aesthetic. This is a departure from its predecessor – the Phone (3a) Pro – and most previous Phone models, many of which feature Nothing's recognizable transparent back design.

The Phone (4a) features a polycarbonate frame with a glass back, in line with prior Nothing designs, and replaces the full Glyph interface with a vertical "Glyph Bar" that contains 63 individual LEDs.

=== Colour options ===
The Phone (4a) comes in four different colours: white, black, pink, and blue. The (4a) Pro comes in three colours: silver, black, and pink.

== Specifications ==
Both variants come with different technical specifications; however, the Phone (4a) Pro is designed to offer a better overall experience.

=== Hardware ===
The Phone (4a) has a 6.78–inch flexible AMOLED display with a 1224 × 2720 pixel resolution and a 20:9 aspect ratio with a variable refresh rate range of 30 Hz – 120 Hz, while the Phone (4a) Pro has a 6.83–inch flexible AMOLED with 1260 × 2800 pixel resolution and a 20:9 aspect ratio with a variable refresh rate range of 30 Hz – 144 Hz. Both Phones feature Gorilla Glass 7i, which is designed to deliver significantly improved scratch resistance compared to previous generations. The international versions of the Phone (4a) and Phone (4a) Pro contain 5,080 mAh Li-ion batteries, while the India-specific versions have modestly larger 5,400 mAh batteries. Both device models support 50W fast charging and 7.5-watt reverse wired charging; however, they lack wireless charging.

=== Software ===
The Phone (4a) and Phone (4a) Pro both come with Nothing OS 4.1, which is based on Android 16. The official software support window encompasses 3 major Android upgrades and 6 years of security updates.

== See also ==
- Nothing Phone (2a) / (2a) Plus
