= CMF Phone 2 Pro =

2025 Android smartphone

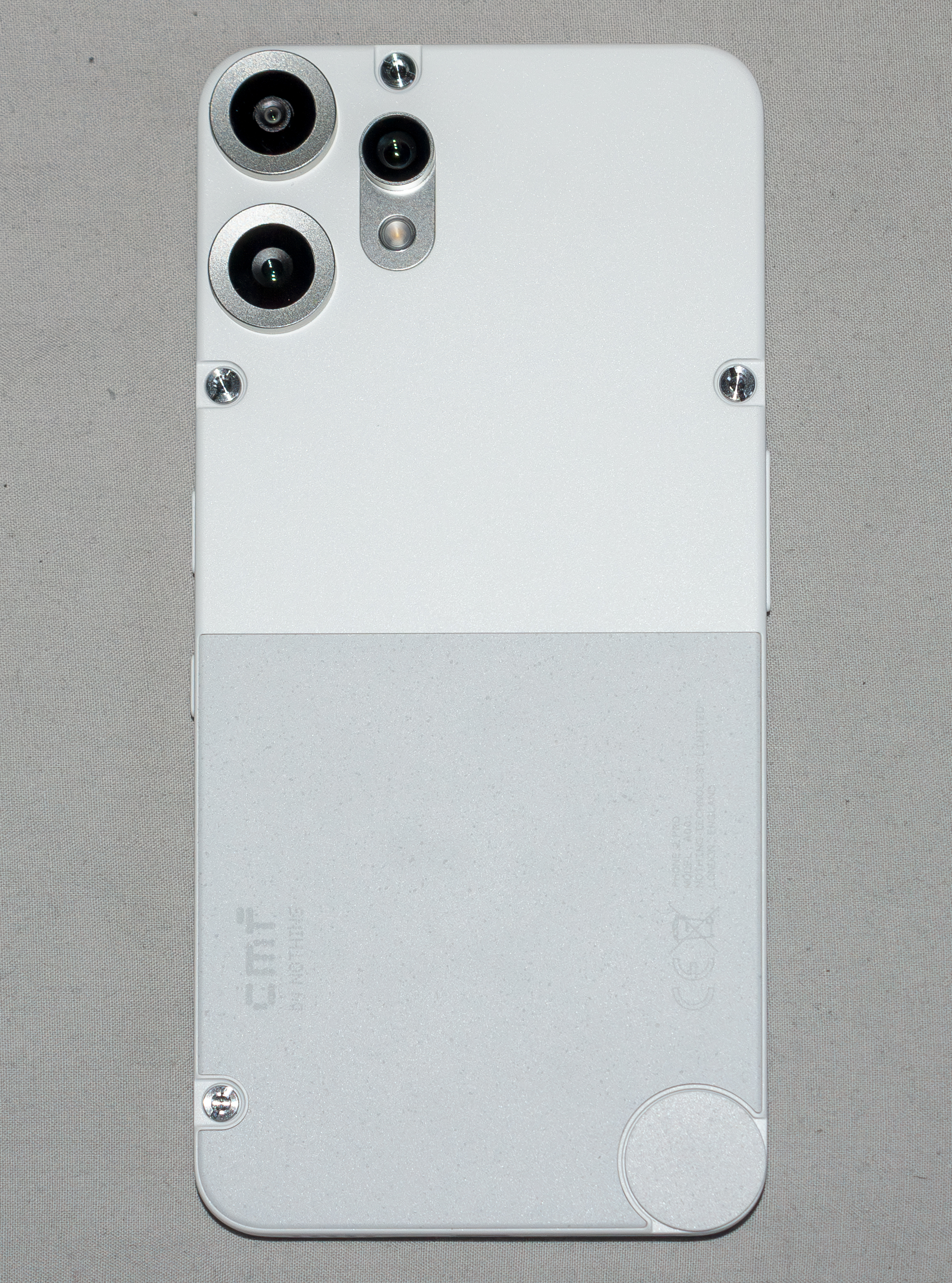
- A white CMF Phone 2 Pro
- Brand: CMF by Nothing
- Developer: Nothing
- Series: CMF Phone
- First released: May 2025
- Predecessor: CMF Phone 1
- Related: Nothing Phone 3a Lite
- Dimensions: 164 x 78 x 7.8 mm (6.46 x 3.07 x 0.31 in)
- Weight: 6.53 oz (185 g)
- Operating system: Nothing OS 4.0
- System-on-chip: Mediatek Dimensity 7300 Pro (4 nm)
- CPU: Octa-core (4x2.5 GHz Cortex-A78 & 4x2.0 GHz Cortex-A55)
- GPU: Mali-G615 MC2
- Storage: 128GB, 256GB
- Removable storage: microSDXC
- SIM: nanoSIM
- Battery: 5,000 mAh
- Charging: 33W (wired), 5W reverse charge
- Rear camera: 50 MP, f/1.9, 24 mm (wide), 1/1.57", 1.0 μm, dual pixel PDAF; 50 MP, f/1.9, 50mm (telephoto), 1/2.88", PDAF, 2x optical zoom 8 MP, f/2.2, 15 mm, 120˚ (ultrawide), 1/4.0", 1.12 μm
- Front camera: 16 MP, f/2.0, 22 mm (wide), 1/3.0"
- Display: 6.77 in (172 mm) diagonal AMOLED; 1080×2392 px 1B colors

CMF Phone 2 Pro (internal name A001) is an Android smartphone manufactured by CMF. It was announced on 28 April 2025, and was released on 12 May 2025.

In Marques Brownlee's annual "Smartphone Awards" he named it the best phone in the category "Best Value".

== Hardware ==
The Phone 2 Pro is powered by a Mediatek Dimensity 7300 Pro (4 nm) processor and the Nothing OS 4.0 operating system, a variant of Android 16. It has two storage variants, both expandable via a microSD card of up to 2 TB: 128GB with 8GB RAM, or 256GB with 8GB RAM.

The phone has a 6.77 inch AMOLED display which supports always-on display, 120 Hz refresh rate, and HDR10+. It has a resolution of 1080x2392px and supports Ultra HDR.

The Phone 2 Pro has three back cameras: 50MP with 24mm (wide), 50MP with 50mm (telephoto), and 8MP with 15mm (120 degree ultra wide). It supports 4K video at 30 fps and 1080p at 30, 60, or 120 fps. Its front camera is 16MP with 22mm (wide) and can shoot up to 1080p at 30 fps.

The phone has an under-display fingerprint sensor. Its battery is 5000 mAh, and supports 33W wired charging. The phone's colour variants are orange, black, white, and light green.

== Software ==
The Phone 2 Pro runs Nothing OS 3.2 (a variant of Android 15) and offers 3 major Android updates. Nothing OS is developed by CMF's parent company, Nothing.
