= Nothing Phone 3a/3a Pro =

2025 Android smartphone produced by Nothing

Nothing Phone 3a Nothing Phone 3a Pro
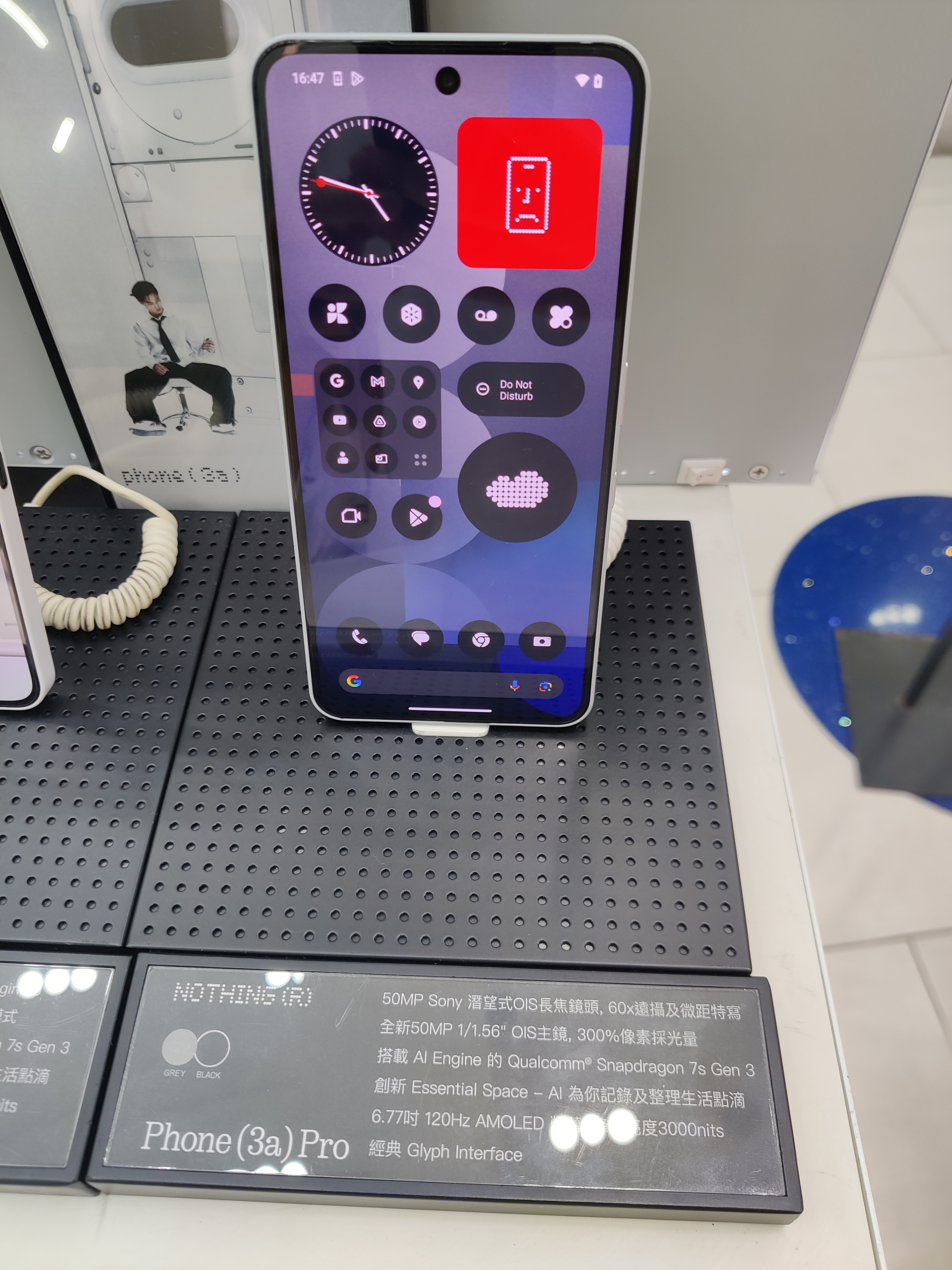
- The front of the Nothing Phone 3a Pro
- Manufacturer: Nothing Technology Limited
- Type: Smartphone
- Series: Phone
- First released: March 4, 2025; 19 months ago
- Predecessor: Phone 2a
- Form factor: Slate
- Colors: Black, White, Blue
- Dimensions: 163.5 mm (6.44 in) H 77.5 mm (3.05 in) W 8.4 mm (0.33 in) D
- Weight: 3a: 201g 3a Pro: 211g
- Operating system: Android 16 with Nothing OS 4.0 (up to 3 years of Android upgrades and 6 years of security patches)
- System-on-chip: Qualcomm SM7635 Snapdragon 7s Gen 3 (4 nm)
- CPU: Octa-core (1x2.5 GHz Cortex-A720 & 3x2.4 GHz Cortex-A720 & 4x1.8 GHz Cortex-A520)
- GPU: Adreno 710 (940 MHz)
- Modem: Qualcomm Snapdragon 7s Gen 3 (4 nm)
- Memory: 128 GB: 8 GB RAM; 256 GB: 12 GB RAM LPDDR4X
- Storage: 128 and 256 GB UFS 2.2
- SIM: Dual-SIM (Nano-SIM)
- Battery: 5000 mAh, li-ion, removable
- Charging: 50 W wired, 50% in 19 min, 100% in 56 min
- Rear camera: 3a Triple camera Setup: Samsung ISOCELL GN9 50 MP, f/1.88, 24mm (wide), 1/1.57", 1.0µm, PDAF, OIS; Samsung ISOCELL GN5 50 MP, f/2.0, 50mm (telephoto), 1/2.74", 0.64µm, PDAF (25cm - ∞), 2x optical zoom; Sony IMX 355, 8 MP, f/2.2, 15mm, 120˚ (ultrawide), 1/4.0", 1.12µm; 3a Pro Camera Setup: Samsung GNJ, 50 MP, f/1.9, 24mm (wide), 1/1.57", 1.0µm, dual pixel PDAF, OIS; Sony LYT-600, 50 MP, f/2.6, 70mm (periscope telephoto) (15cm - ∞), 1/1.95", 0.8µm, PDAF, OIS, 3x optical zoom; Sony IMX 366, 8 MP, f/2.2, 15mm, 120˚ (ultrawide), 1/4.0", 1.12µm
- Front camera: 3a: 32 MP, f/2.2, 22mm (wide), 1/3.44"; 3a Pro: 50 MP, f/2.2, 24mm (wide), 1/2.76"
- Display: Type: LTPS Flexible AMOLED, 1B colors, 120Hz, HDR10+, 800 nits (typ), 1300 nits (HBM), 3000 nits (peak); Size: 6.77 in (172 mm) ~88.0% screen-to-body ratio; Resolution: 1080 x 2392 pixels; Protection: Panda Glass
- Connectivity: Bluetooth 5.4; A2DP, LE NFC; GPS; GLONASS, BDS, GALILEO, QZSS; WiFi 802.11 a/b/g/n/ac/6, dual-band, Wi-Fi Direct
- Model: A059, A059p

The Nothing Phone 3a series is a series of mid-range Android smartphones manufactured by Nothing Technology Limited. They were announced on March 4, 2025, and made available on March 11, 2025. The Pro version has upgraded camera equipment.

== Features ==
Compared to the Phone 3a, the Phone 3a Pro features an upgraded primary camera sensor. It only offers 256 GB of internal storage, compared to the base model's 128 and 256 GB options. Both phones comes with different back design. Additionally, the Pro variant includes a more premium aluminium frame with plastic sides, distinguishing it from the regular 3a, which uses a polycarbonate build.

3a Pro is equipped with a versatile camera system that includes wide-angle, ultra-wide-angle, and a zoom lens with 3x optical magnification. The camera generally delivers sharp images with natural colors, especially in good lighting conditions and with stationary subjects. However, performance may be negatively affected in poor lighting or when shooting moving objects, where stable handling is required.The selfie camera is upgraded to 50MP on the Pro, Whereas the 3a retains the 32MP selfie cam,

Both phones use Panda Glass on their front screens for protection,as opposed to Gorilla Glass 5 on its predecessor.

The 3a appears in three colours: Blue, Black and White.The Pro appears in only Grey and White.

== Community Edition ==
A special community edition of the 3a was released in December 2025. It appeared in a teal-ish green finish. Around 1,000 units were produced. It is spec for spec the same to the 3a. However, the finish and the software had some tweaks. As the name implies, it was made by the community of Nothing,

== Release ==
Pre-orders for the Phone (3a) series commenced on March 4, 2025, with sales starting on March 11, 2025. The device is available in select markets, including the United States, United Kingdom, and India.

== Reception ==
An early review of the Phone 3a series was positive, highlighting their distinctive design, robust performance, and value. The quality of the display and long battery life were commended.

Tech Adviser praised the Phone 3a's design, performance, software, and price; however, some reviewers criticized the performance of its ultrawide camera.

The Phone 3a Pro received similar praise, particularly for its enhanced camera capabilities and faster charging speeds. However, some reviewers questioned whether the price difference between the two models justified the improvements for all users.
