= CMF by Nothing =

Indian consumer electronics company

CMF India Private Limited
- Logo used since 2023
- Type: Private
- Industry: Consumer electronics
- Founded: September 2023; 3 years ago
- Founder: Carl Pei
- Headquarters: Delhi NCR, India
- Area served: Worldwide
- Products: Smartphones, Wireless earphones, Smartwatches, Chargers
- Owner: Optiemus Group (51.1%); Nothing Technology Limited (48.9%)
- Website: cmf.tech

CMF by Nothing (stylised as cmf) is an India-based consumer electronics company that designs budget-oriented smartphones, audio products and smartwatches. It was launched in September 2023 in London as a low-cost sub-brand of Nothing, the company founded by Carl Pei in 2020, before being spun off as an independently incorporated, India-headquartered subsidiary in December 2025. The brand's name refers to colour, material and finish, an industrial-design term chosen to signal an emphasis on the visual design of low-cost products.

CMF's products are positioned below Nothing's flagship line and are sold mainly in India, the United States and Europe. Its catalogue has grown from an initial pair of earbuds and a smartwatch in 2023 to include multiple generations of wireless earphones, over-ear headphones, smartwatches, two Android smartphones and USB-C chargers. Reviewers have generally credited CMF with unusually distinctive design and pricing for its market segment, while criticising individual products for missing features such as wireless charging and inconsistent build quality.

== History ==
=== Launch as a Nothing sub-brand ===
Nothing, founded by Carl Pei in 2020, introduced CMF in September 2023 as a lower-priced line intended to bring the parent company's minimalist, transparent design language to a wider audience without the cost of its flagship products. The brand's first products, the Buds Pro earbuds, the Watch Pro smartwatch and the Power 65W GaN charger, went on sale that September.

CMF entered the smartphone market in July 2024 with the Phone (1), and expanded into India, which quickly became its largest market, with continued releases through 2025. By 2025, market-research firm IDC identified Nothing (including CMF) as the fastest-growing smartphone brand in India, with year-on-year shipment growth of 85 percent in the second quarter of that year, and a domestic smartphone market share of roughly 2 percent.

=== Spin-off and Indian incorporation ===
In September 2025, Nothing announced plans to spin off CMF as an independent company headquartered in India, citing the price sensitivity of the Indian market, where phones priced under $200 accounted for more than 40 percent of shipments, and CMF's rapid growth there. As part of the spin-off, CMF entered a manufacturing joint venture with the Indian original design manufacturer Optiemus, with Nothing stating it planned to invest more than $100 million in the venture over three to five years and create over 1,800 jobs.

CMF was formally registered as an independent legal entity, CMF India Private Limited, on 23 December 2025, with Nothing co-founder and president Akis Evangelidis describing India as the brand's new global headquarters for leadership, operations and research and development. Nothing has continued to describe CMF as a distinct brand aimed at a broader, more price-conscious audience than its own flagship line, and the two brands have since shared retail space, including at Nothing's first Indian store.

In June 2026, CMF said it would delay the successor to the Phone 2 Pro because of a global shortage of memory chips, stating that rising component costs made it unable to produce a meaningfully improved phone at an acceptable price.

== Products ==
=== Audio ===
CMF's audio lineup has expanded from a single pair of earbuds in 2023 to several tiers of true wireless earbuds, a neckband model and over-ear headphones, most distinguished by a rotating "Smart Dial" control on the case or headband and by circular, screw-accented cases.

CMF audio products
Product	Launched	Launch price	Notable features
CMF Buds Pro	September 2023	$49	Circular case; single-device Bluetooth; IP54-rated earbuds
CMF Buds	March 2024	$39	Decorative aluminium dial doubling as a lanyard loop
CMF Neckband Pro	March 2024	₹1,999 (India only)	Neckband-mounted dial; magnetic earbuds
CMF Buds Pro 2	July 2024	$59	Functional Smart Dial for volume and assistant control
CMF Buds 2 / 2 Plus / 2a	April 2025	$49–$69	Three-tier range with shared IP-rated design and Dirac Opteo tuning
CMF Headphone Pro	September 2025	$99	Over-ear design with interchangeable ear cushions and a 3.5 mm jack

Reception of the audio lineup has been broadly positive, with reviewers repeatedly describing the Buds Pro 2 and Buds 2 Plus as competitive with earbuds costing significantly more, while noting that entry-level models such as the Buds 2a make more noticeable compromises on noise cancellation and battery life.

=== Watches ===
CMF has released three generations of smartwatch, running a proprietary operating system rather than Wear OS, with successive models trading a swappable-bezel design for a slimmer case and longer battery life.

The original Watch Pro (2023) offered a 1.96-inch AMOLED display, GPS, heart-rate tracking and call handling at $69. A vulnerability in its companion app that could have exposed users' email addresses was reported and patched shortly after launch. The Watch Pro 2 (2024) added an IP68 rating and an interchangeable bezel, a feature reviewers found more novel than useful, and several reported unreliable fitness-tracking sensors. The Watch 3 Pro (2025) dropped the swappable bezel in favour of a larger AMOLED panel and longer battery life, and launched at a higher price of $99.

=== Smartphones ===
CMF's Android smartphones use MediaTek processors and share the brand's signature "Accessory Point", a rear mounting ring for attaching cases, stands and lanyards, along with visible, largely decorative screws.

The Phone (1) (July 2024, $199) was widely praised as unusually capable for its price, though reviewers criticised its lack of wireless charging and near-field communication support. The Phone 2 Pro (April 2025, $279) added a telephoto camera and NFC, addressing the earlier complaint, and was described by several outlets as resetting expectations for budget Android phones. A successor was delayed in June 2026 because of rising memory-chip prices (see § Spin-off and Indian incorporation).

=== Accessories ===
CMF has sold three gallium nitride USB-C chargers, rated at 65W, 100W and 140W, each in a single dark-grey colourway, released without individual product announcements. The 140W charger has been sold only in the United Kingdom and other non-US markets.

== Reception ==
Trade press coverage of CMF has consistently framed it as an unusually design-conscious entrant to a budget-electronics segment more often associated with generic, unbranded products, crediting it with distinctive industrial design at prices well below Nothing's own flagship line. Coverage of individual releases has been more mixed: reviewers have consistently praised the value of CMF's mid-tier audio and phone products relative to competitors, while flagging recurring weaknesses in entry-level models, smartwatch sensor accuracy and the omission of features such as wireless charging that are common on rival phones at similar prices.

=== Industry analysis of the spin-off ===
Coverage of the 2025 spin-off placed CMF within a broader pattern of smartphone makers separating budget sub-brands into distinct companies, comparing the move to Xiaomi's split with Poco, Huawei's sale of Honor and Oppo's separation of Realme. IDC India analyst Navkendar Singh told TechCrunch that separating the brands let CMF pursue India's budget wearables and phone segments while protecting Nothing's own positioning in the $400–$600 mid-premium range from being associated with a value-for-money image. Android Central similarly linked the timing of the spin-off to Nothing's contemporaneous $200 million Series C funding round, suggesting the restructuring let Nothing concentrate that capital on premium, AI-oriented devices while CMF pursued sub-$200 growth independently. CMF's expansion has also been tied to the hiring of Himanshu Tandon, a former Poco India executive, as vice-president of business for CMF shortly before the spin-off was announced.
