= Nothing (company) =

London-based consumer electronics manufacturer

Nothing Technology Limited
- Type: Private
- Industry: Consumer electronics
- Predecessor: Essential
- Founded: October 2020; 6 years ago
- Founder: Carl Pei (CEO)
- Headquarters: London, England, UK
- Area served: Worldwide
- Products: Smartphones, Earphones
- Website: nothing.tech

Nothing Technology Limited (stylised as NOTHING) is a British consumer electronics company headquartered in London. It was co-founded in 2020 by Carl Pei (co-founder of OnePlus), alongside Akis Evangelidis, David Sanmartín García, Steven Gao, and Levi Li, among others. The company develops smartphones, audio products, and related software, positioning itself as a design-focused challenger brand.

Nothing released its first product, the Ear (1) wireless earbuds, in July 2021, followed by its debut smartphone, the Phone (1), in 2022. The company has since released successive generations, including the Phone (2), Ear (2), Phone (3), and Ear (3), and in 2026 the Phone (4a) and Phone (4a) Pro. Alongside its flagship devices, the company also introduced CMF by Nothing, a budget-oriented sub-brand that was spun off as a separate company in 2025, and then registered as a standalone Indian company in 2026.

Nothing’s devices run Nothing OS, a closed source, customised version of Android preloaded with Google Mobile Services, and are distributed in markets including Europe, India, and North America. The company has raised venture funding from GV (formerly Google Ventures), EQT Ventures, and Tiger Global, along with high-profile individual investors including Tony Fadell and Casey Neistat. Its products are noted for their transparent hardware designs and the Glyph Interface, a system of LED lighting on the rear of its smartphones.

== History ==
Nothing was co-founded by Carl Pei (co-founder of OnePlus), Akis Evangelidis, David Sanmartín García, Steven Gao, and Levi Li, among others. Pei left OnePlus in October 2020 and raised $7 million from investors including Tony Fadell, Kevin Lin, Steve Huffman, and Casey Neistat. The company was officially announced in January 2021, and soon acquired the brand assets of Essential Products. It also partnered with Teenage Engineering, the Stockholm-based electronics company known for its product design.

The company launched its first product, the transparent ear (1) wireless earbuds, in July 2021. It later secured $50 million in funding and announced a partnership with Qualcomm.

In 2022, Nothing raised $70 million in Series B funding, and introduced its first smartphone, the Phone (1), featuring a distinctive LED-based Glyph Interface. The company also opened a physical retail store in London’s Soho district in December.

In 2023, Nothing released the Ear (2) earbuds and previewed smartphones using Snapdragon 8+ Gen 1 chipsets. The company also launched "CMF by Nothing", a sub-brand focused on affordable, design-led products.

In November 2023, Nothing faced backlash over a messaging app that claimed to offer end-to-end encryption but was discovered to store messages in plain text. The app was withdrawn within 24 hours.

Shortly afterward, the company raised $96 million in a Series B1 funding round led by Highland Europe.

By 2024, Nothing had surpassed $1 billion in lifetime sales, doubling annual revenue to over $500 million and selling more than 7 million devices. In India, it became the fastest-growing smartphone brand, with over 577% year-on-year growth. The CMF Phone 1, featuring a MediaTek Dimensity 7300 processor and modular customisation, launched in July 2024.

On March 4 2025, the company introduced the Phone (3a) and Phone (3a) Pro, a pair of mid-range smartphones powered by Snapdragon 7s Gen 3. Alongside the release of the phones came a new software feature known as “Essential Space”, an AI powered tool designed to assist the user with various organisational tasks. This feature was also included on the budget CMF Phone 2 Pro, announced on 28 April 2025, and launched on May 6 2025.

The company revealed the flagship Phone (3) as its successor to the Phone (2), along with over-ear headphones, dubbed Headphone (1), at a launch event on 1 July 2025.

In September 2025, Nothing announced it would spin-off CMF into a standalone company based in India. Shortly afterwards, Nothing raised US$200 million in a Series C funding round led by Tiger Global, valuing the company at US$1.3 billion.

By May 2026, the company had surpassed US$2 billion in lifetime revenue and employed around 900 people. On 12 May 2026, British singer-songwriter Charli XCX became a global brand ambassador and shareholder of Nothing. Korean singer V became an ambassador for the company in September 2026.

== Products ==
=== Smartphones ===
List of Nothing devices
Devices	Original version	Current version	Note	Ref.
Phone (1)	Nothing OS 1.0 (Android 12)	Nothing OS 3.2 (Android 15)	EOL	
Phone (2)	Nothing OS 2.0 (Android 13)	Nothing OS 4.1 (Android 16)	EOL	
Phone (2a)	Nothing OS 2.5 (Android 14)	Nothing OS 4.1 (Android 16)		
Phone (2a) Plus	Nothing OS 2.6 (Android 14)	Nothing OS 4.1 (Android 16)		
Phone (3a) / (3a) Pro	Nothing OS 3.0 (Android 15)	Nothing OS 4.1 (Android 16)		
Phone (3)	Nothing OS 3.5 (Android 15)	Nothing OS 4.1 (Android 16)		
Phone (3a) Lite	Nothing OS 3.5 (Android 15)	Nothing OS 4.1 (Android 16)		
Phone (4a) / (4a) Pro	Nothing OS 4.1 (Android 16)	Nothing OS 4.1 (Android 16)		

List of CMF devices
Device	Original version	Current version	Ref.
CMF Phone 1	Nothing OS 2.6 (Android 14)	Nothing OS 4.1 (Android 16)	
CMF Phone 2 Pro	Nothing OS 3.2 (Android 15)	Nothing OS 4.1 (Android 16)	

==== Phone (1) ====
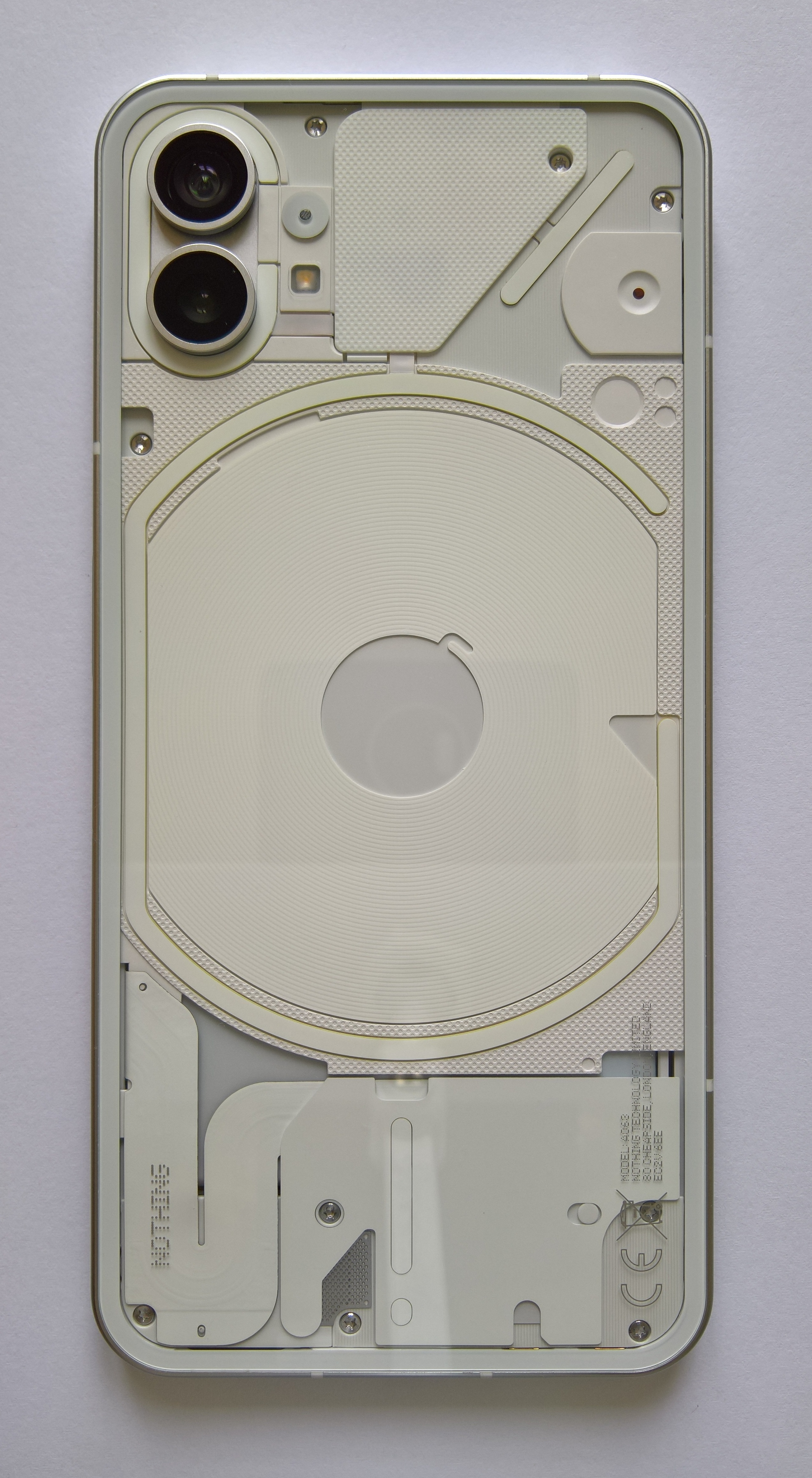
A white coloured Nothing Phone (1) with its translucent back shown

On 23 March 2022, Nothing announced its first smartphone named the "Phone (1)".

The phone runs on the Android operating system, and its user interface is named NothingOS. It went on sale on 21 July 2022.

In June 2022, Nothing opened an invite-only pre-order for the "Phone (1)", which reached up to 100,000 registrations on the waiting list. The device, which was unveiled on 12 July in London, features a Qualcomm Snapdragon 778G+ chipset and transparent design.

==== Phone (2) ====
On 11 July 2023, Nothing announced its second smartphone named the "Phone (2)". It was released on 21 July 2023. The software front is covered by Android 13 with NothingOS 2.0 skin on top. The phone comes with Qualcomm Snapdragon 8+ Gen 1 chipset.

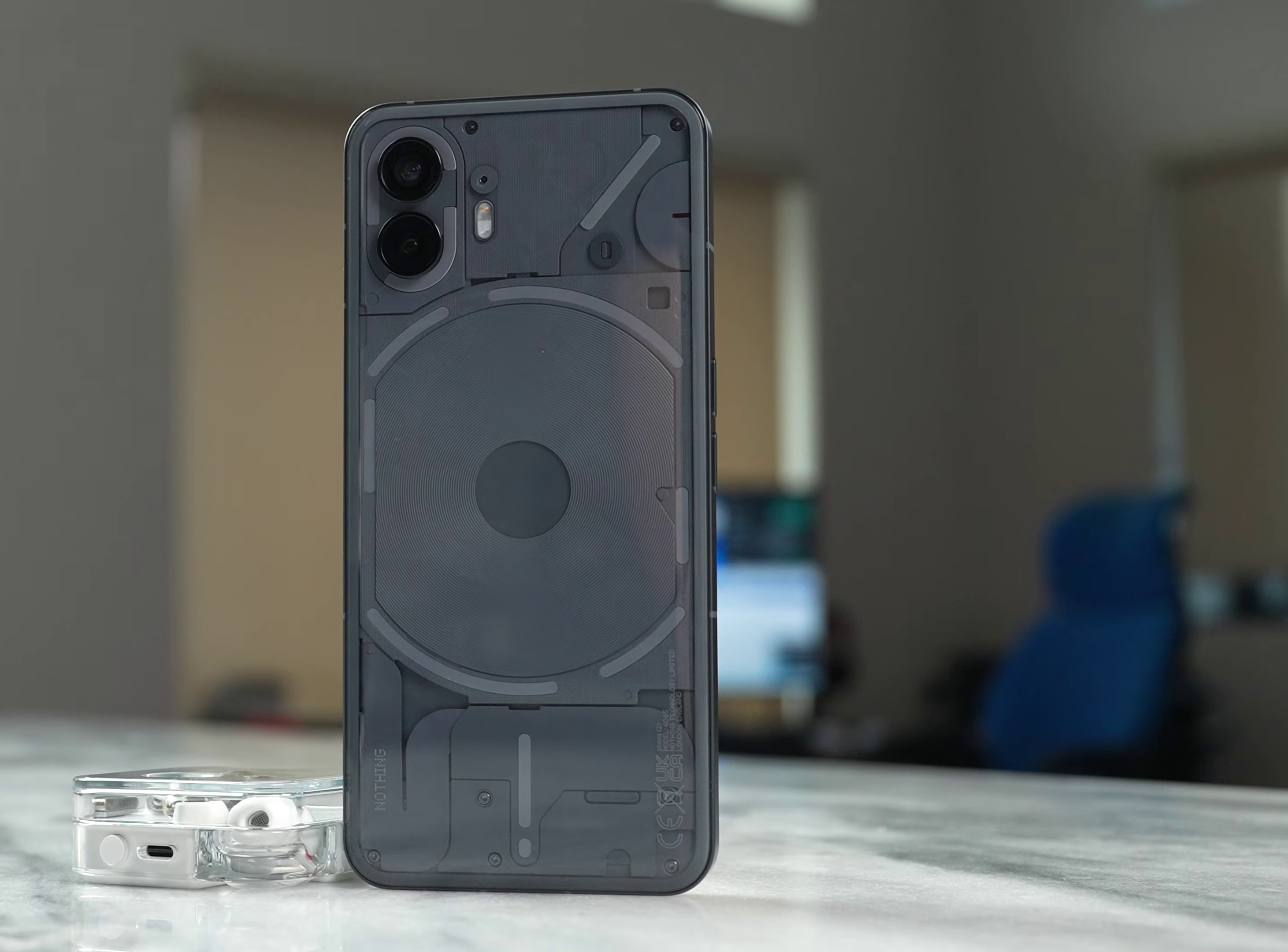
A black coloured Phone (2) with the Glyph Interface visible on the back of the phone

==== Phone (2a) ====
Nothing announced its budget smartphone, the "Phone (2a)", on 5 March 2024. It came with the MediaTek Dimensity 7200 Pro chipset running Android 14 and with user interface NothingOS 2.5, a 6.7-inch 120-Hz OLED display, and a 5000 mAh battery.

Phone (2a) surpassed 100,000 units sold in its first day after release.

The Nothing Phone (2a) Plus, released in 2024, is an upgraded version of the standard Phone (2a) with enhanced features aimed at improving performance, display quality, and photography capabilities. Key upgrades include a MediaTek Dimensity 7350 Pro processor for smooth multitasking and better gaming performance, achieving high benchmark scores compared to its predecessors.

==== Phone (3a) and Phone (3a) Pro ====
Nothing Phone (3a) and Nothing Phone (3a) Pro were announced on 4 March 2025. Both phones have AMOLED 6.77 inches 120Hz displays, both exist in 128GB and 256GB storage variants, both have the same 5000mAh battery and the same Snapdragon 7s Gen 3 (4 nm) chip. The main difference is in camera type; the Phone (3a) Pro features a periscope telephoto lens with 3x optical zoom, whereas the standard Phone (3a) variant also includes 2x optical zoom but is equipped with a standard telephoto lens.

==== Phone (3) ====
On 1 July 2025 Nothing launched the Nothing Phone 3, which has a 6.67-inch AMOLED display, Snapdragon 8s Gen 4 processor, and a triple 50MP rear camera setup including a periscope telephoto lens. It introduces the "Glyph Matrix", a circular dot-matrix LED interface on the back, completely replacing the previous Glyph Interface. The Phone 3 debuted with Nothing OS 3.5 based on Android 15, with a confirmed upgrade path to Android 16 via Nothing OS 4.0 later in the year. It was released globally, including in the U.S. for the first time, with prices starting at ₹79,999 in India and $799 internationally.

==== Phone (4a) and Phone (4a) Pro ====
In March 2026, Nothing released the Phone (4a) and (4a) Pro.

==== Phone (4b) ====
In July 2026, Nothing released the Phone (4b).

=== Audio products ===
==== Ear (1) ====
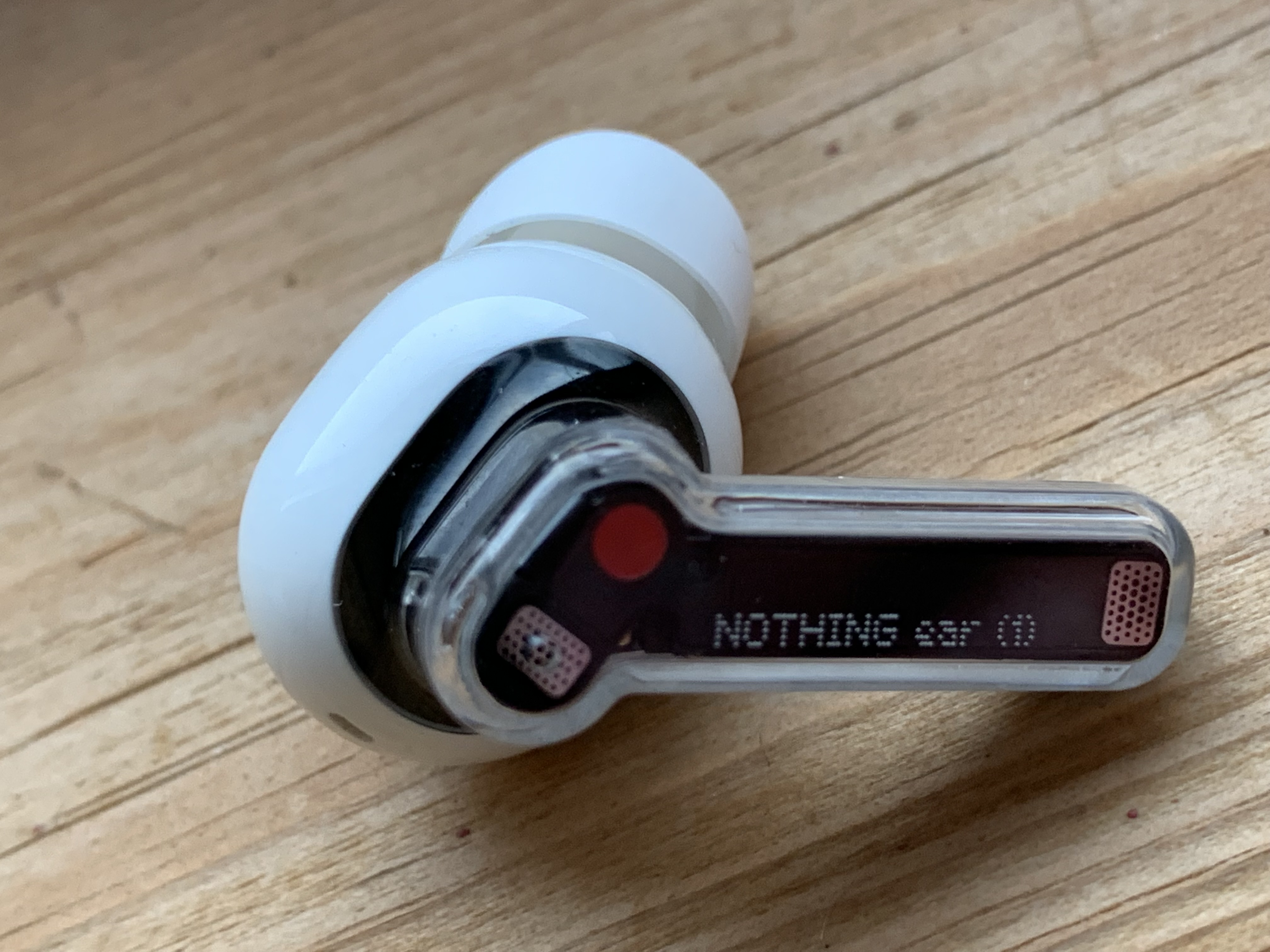
The Nothing ear (1)

The Nothing Ear 1, stylised as ear (1), is Nothing's first product. Announced on 27 July 2021, the Ear 1 is a set of wireless earbuds. The earbuds can be connected by Bluetooth and have up to 34 hours of battery life when used with the charging case, and 5.7 hours of battery life with ANC off; with 24 hours with the case used and up to four hours for the earbuds themselves with ANC on. The earbuds went on sale on 17 August 2021, at $99/£99/€99.

A black coloured version was announced on 6 December 2021, and went on sale on 13 December. Nothing also announced on that day that the Ear 1 earbuds were now going carbon neutral.

On 18 October 2022, Nothing's CEO Carl Pei announced on the social media platform X that the Ear 1's price would be increased to $149 starting on the date 26 October 2022 due to an increase in component costs.

==== Ear (stick) ====
Ear (stick) is a pair of earbuds Nothing released on 4 November 2022. It is the second part of the Ear family and a lower tier version of Ear (1), and does not include noise cancellation, transparency mode, or wireless charging. Ear (stick) launched at a price of $99.

==== Ear (2) ====
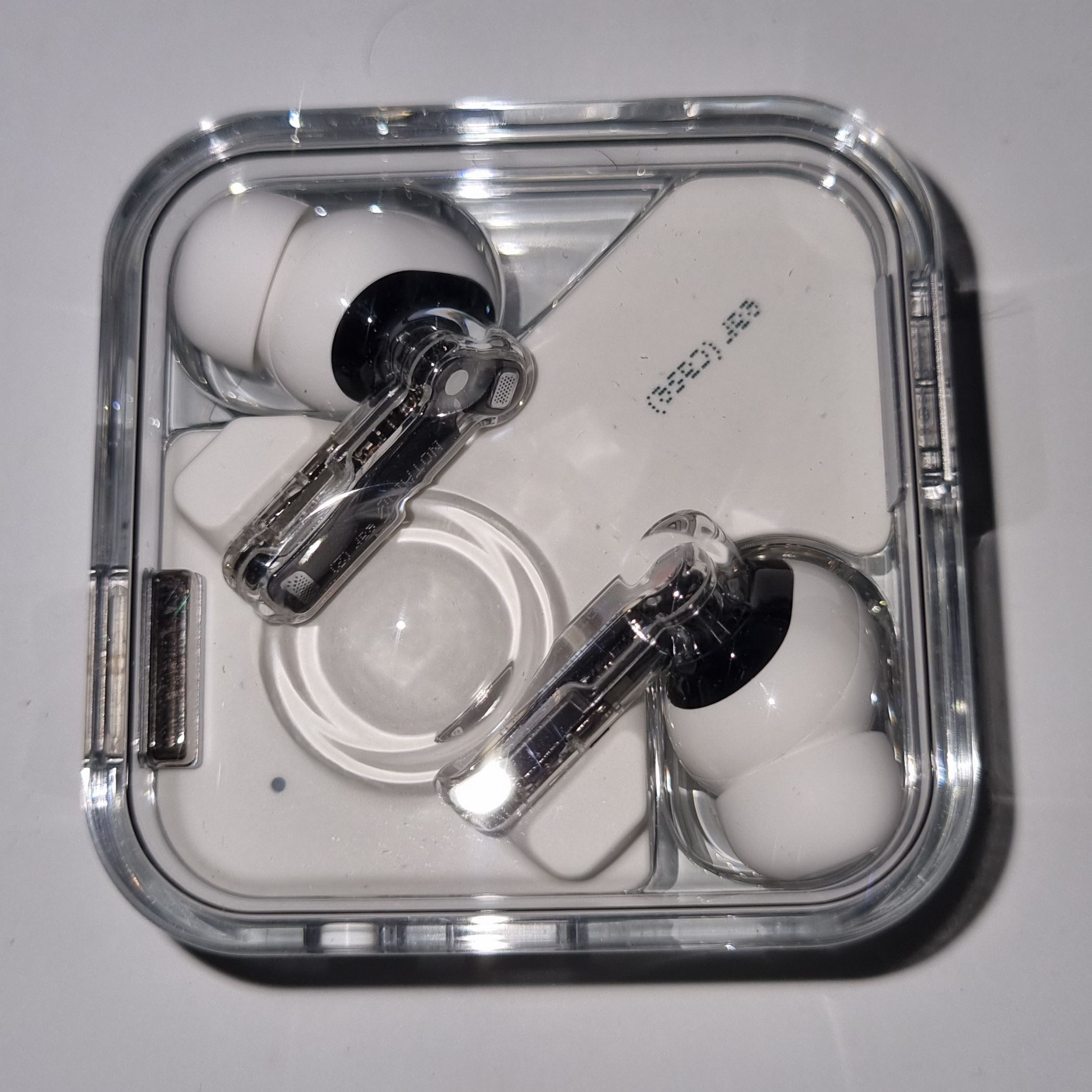
The Nothing ear (2)

In March 2023, Nothing announced the release of their second-generation earbuds, the Nothing Ear (2). These new earphones support the LHDC 5.0 low latency HD audio codec and come equipped with 11.6 mm speakers, similar to its predecessor. The earbuds were launched on 22 March 2023, with reviews mixed.

==== Ear ====
On April 18th, 2024, Nothing announced the release of the Nothing Ear, the third in the Ear lineup. The change in naming convention caused confusion, with many users expressing confusion over the jump from Ear (1), to Ear (2), to Ear. The Ear supports LHDC 5.0 and LDAC, and supports Nothing's "Advanced Equaliser", a feature in the Nothing X app to finely customise audio tuning, and create profiles, as well as the "Personal Sound Profile", to tune the audio of the earbuds based on how the user hears.

The Ear has improved noise cancelling, a battery advertised to last 40.5 hours, longer than the Ear (2), and comes in white and black colours.

The Ear was originally priced at $149 on launch.

==== Ear (a) ====
On April 18th, 2024, Nothing also announced the Nothing Ear (a), a set of earbuds with a slimmer, longer case than the rest of the main Ear lineup. The Ear (a) comes in yellow, black, or white, and a slightly longer advertised battery life than the Nothing Ear at an advertised 42.5 hours, but does not have wireless charging.

The Ear (a) was originally priced at $99 on launch.

The Ear (a) won a Red Dot award for the design of the earbuds and the case.

==== Ear (open) ====
On September 24, 2024, Nothing announced the Ear (open), a set of open-ear earbuds for $149. The Ear (open) have an IP54 rating, 14.2mm dynamic driver, and support only AAC and SBC codecs. They support dual Bluetooth connection, as well as Google Fast Pair and Microsoft Swift Pair.

The Ear (open) have an advertised battery life of 30 hours, with no wireless charging, which some reviewers noted as an unexpected drawback.

The Ear (open) won a Red Dot award for the design of the earbuds and the case.

==== Headphone (1) ====
Nothing announced a new over-ear headphone product at their launch event on 1 July 2025, the same time they announced the Phone (3). The Headphone (1) feature an audio system by KEF and maintain a similar see-through tech appearance as Nothing's other products, while also featuring a hard case and a rounded rectangle earcups, differentiating them from other popular over-ear headphones such as Sony's XM lineup and Apple's AirPods Max. Comparative to the other popular headphones, the Headphone (1) featured physical analog buttons like a roller for controlling volume and buttons and switches for skipping, pausing, and accepting calls.

In 2025, the Headphone (1) were $299 MSRP. There were two colour options, black and white. The headphones achieved an 80-hour battery life with active noise canceling off and 35 hours with it on. RTINGS.com particularly noted its affinity as travel headphones with its battery life and noise isolation. However, The Guardian's review highlighted that while the headphones are generally repairable with replacement ear cushions, they are not made with any recycled materials.

==== Headphone (a) ====
Nothing confirmed the headphone (a), a lower-cost headphone similar in design to the Nothing Phone 4a debuting with the on February 27, 2026. and released them on March 5, 2026 with a "bold yellow design" and "the longest battery life of any audio product in its lineup." They have been seen frequently in the Charli XCX brand ambassador photoshoot.

==== Ear (3) ====
On September 18, 2025, Nothing announced the Nothing Ear (3) for $179 coming in white and black colourways. The primary advertised feature of the Ear (3) is the charging case, which has a built-in dual-microphone system dubbed "Super Mic", activated by a "Talk" button on the side, advertised as being able to "[cut] through surrounding noise up to 95 dB". The Talk button can also be used to activate a voice assistant, chosen in the Nothing X app, when not already in a call.

Some reviewers reported problems with the Talk button and case microphones, stating audio quality and noise cancellation was not as good as advertised, incompatibility with certain calling apps, awkward usage, or overall considering the feature unnecessary, while others stated the audio quality was better, though most agreed the difference between the case and the earbuds themselves was not substantial.

The earbuds have an advertised battery life of 10 hours, and 38 hours with the case if the ANC is disabled, and 5.5 hours, rising to 22 hours with the case if ANC is enabled. The Ear (3) supports Bluetooth 5.4 with AAC, SBC, or LDAC, as well as Google Fast Pair and Microsoft Swift Pair, and are IP54 rated.

=== Nothing OS ===
Nothing OS
- Version of the Android operating system

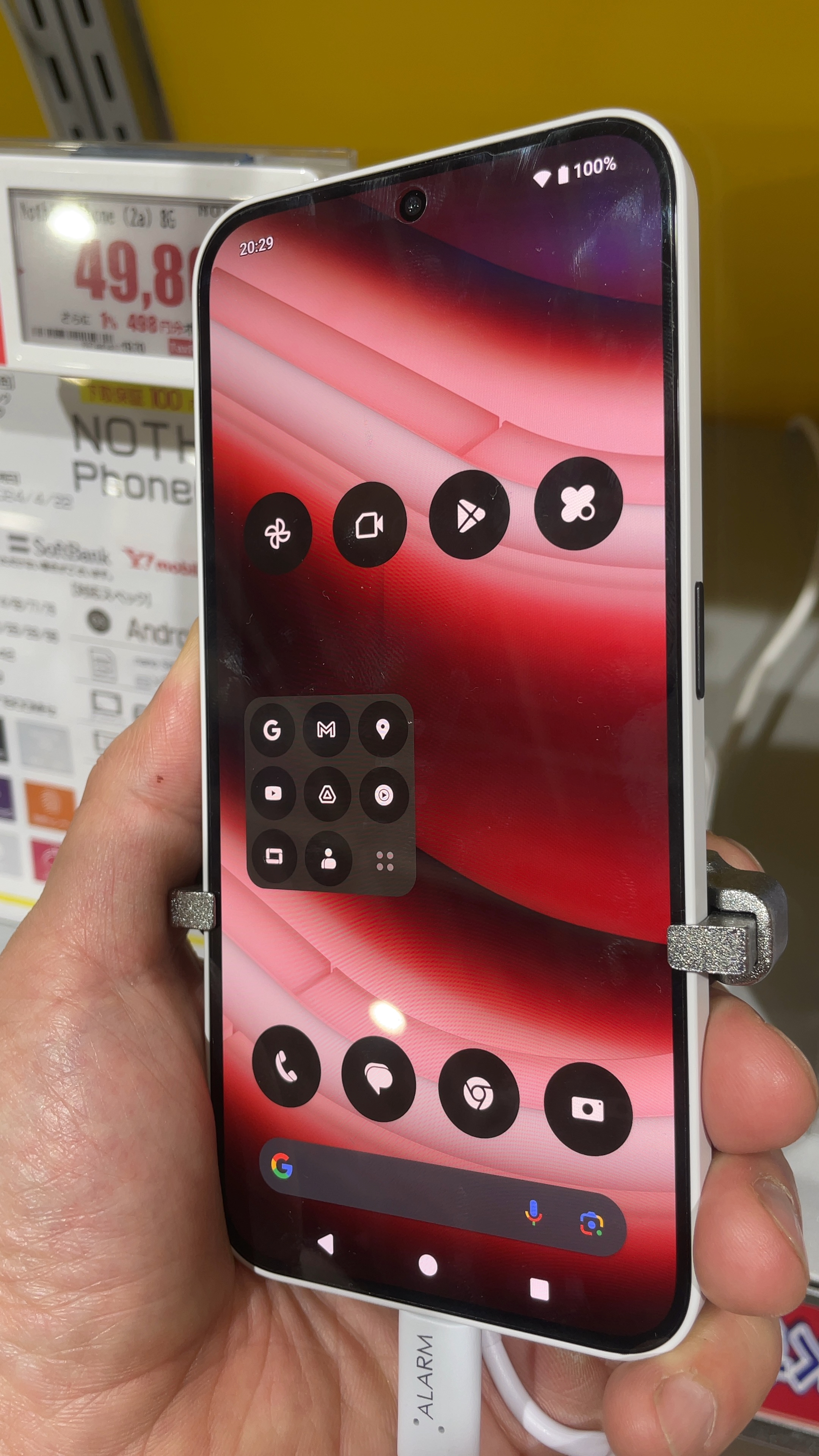
- Nothing OS 3.0 running on Phone 2a
- Developer: Nothing Technology Limited
- Written in: Java
- OS family: Android (Linux)
- Working state: Current
- Source model: Closed-source
- General availability: 21 July 2022; 4 years ago
- Latest release: Nothing OS 4.1, based on Android 16 / 21 November 2025; 11 months ago
- Update method: Over-the-air
- Default user interface: Graphical
- License: Proprietary
- Official website: nothing.tech/nothing-os
- Tagline: Pure Instinct

Nothing OS is a user interface (UI) developed by Nothing Technology Limited for Android devices from 2022 running Android 12 and later. It is exclusively made for Nothing and CMF phones.

This skin was first developed for Phone (1).

==== Nothing OS 1.0 ====
On 23 March 2022 during Nothing's keynote speech on their first smartphone, Nothing announced their user interface for Android, Nothing OS.

==== Nothing OS 1.5 ====
Nothing OS 1.5 was released with version 1.5.2 on 16 February 2023, powered by Android 13. It has improved performance and glyph interface. The update introduces a new weather app, and other features, including improvements to the performance and other Android 13 features, like Android's new QR Code reader, according to The Verge. It was officially released to the public on 22 February 2023, via a press release by Nothing. Nothing OS 1.5.3 was released on 14 March 2023, bringing support for the Nothing Ear 2.

Nothing OS 1.5.4 was released on 5 May 2023, users can send feedback to Nothing about the software experience from within the phone. The Bluetooth functionality in Quick Settings gives quick access to paired devices. Users can now scan UPI QR codes with the camera app and make payments directly.

==== Nothing OS 2.0 ====
Nothing OS 2.0 was released on 28 August 2023. New features include a monochromatic icon pack and updating the Glyph Interface to version 2. Glyph Torch can be used as a flashlight, and essential Notifications allows select contacts and apps to leave a persistent notification.

==== Nothing OS 2.5 ====
Nothing OS 2.5 was released on 15 December 2023 based on Android 14, bringing customization features for wallpapers, new gestures and widgets, and quality of life improvements.

==== Nothing OS 3.0 ====
Nothing OS 3.0 was released on 19 December 2024 based on Android 15, new features include shared widgets, Nothing Gallery, and improved quick settings. The update came pre-installed on the Phone 3a/3a Pro.

==== Nothing OS 4.0 ====
Nothing OS 4.0 was released on 1 October 2025 for the Nothing Phone (2), (2a) series, and the (3), and released on 24 October 2025 for the (3a) series based on Android 16. Refined UI elements bring smoother animations and a deeper "Extra Dark Mode" for a cleaner, more fluid experience. The update improves multitasking with an enhanced "Pop-up View" that allows for quick switching between two floating apps. A new lock screen feature called "Lock Glimpse" provides dynamically curated wallpapers and personalized content. The TrueLens Engine upgrades the camera and gallery apps with new controls, a "Stretch" preset developed with photographer Jordan Hemingway, and a more intuitive layout. System performance is also enhanced, with faster app launch times, better connectivity, and improved responsiveness.

==== Nothing OS 5.0 ====
Nothing OS 5.0 was announced on 25 August 2026 for the Nothing Phone (3), (2a) series, (4a) series, (3a) series, (4B), and CMF Phone 2 Pro. It's set to begin it's Open Beta on 26 August 2026 for the Phone 3 with more phones being added later.

=== Applications ===
==== Essential Space ====
Essential Space is an AI-powered content management feature developed by Nothing Technology Limited, introduced with the launch of the Nothing Phone (3a) series in March 2025. Designed to act as a "second memory," Essential Space enables users to capture, organise, and retrieve digital content such as screenshots, voice notes, and photos through a dedicated hardware button known as the Essential Key.

In November 2026, Nothing CEO Carl Pei announced that the company planned to ship its first AI-native product in December 2026. He described it as a screenless productivity tool that could not be replicated as a software application, although its specific functionality and design had not been disclosed.

==== Nothing Chats ====
Nothing Chats was an instant messaging application released by Nothing Technology Limited. It was briefly available on Google Play in November 2023 before being withdrawn due to reports of bugs, reliability concerns, and data security problems.

On 14 November 2023, Nothing announced the app had been developed in collaboration with a company called Sunbird and would offer limited compatibility with Apple’s iMessage. Prior to launch, Android Authority and Ars Technica expressed skepticism about the app’s claims around end-to-end encryption and overall security, citing Sunbird’s track record. Ars Technica specifically warned against sharing Apple credentials with a third party that might not fully grasp the associated risks. On 17 November, shortly after launch, a third-party developer discovered that the app was using a version of a rival open-source project called BlueBubbles but Sunbird failed to procure a TLS certificate, so the application was sending users' service credentials via insecure HTTP. The vulnerability could allow a third-party to intercept users' credentials (one at a time) and use them to impersonate the users to read and send messages. On 18 November, a different user reported that the app was sending all media attachments, including user images, to error-logging service Sentry, and all data to a Firebase cloud-syncing server, with the unencrypted data stored in both places. At the time, the Firebase database contained over 630,000 media files. 9to5Google confirmed that anyone could intercept the application's Firebase credentials (from their own device or any other device), log into Firebase, and see all other users' past and real-time messages. Another third-party developed a script for downloading this data automatically and published the code to GitHub. Within 24 hours, Nothing removed the app from Google Play entirely.

=== Drinks ===
Beer (5.1%) is a beer created by Nothing Technology. The beer was initially announced on 1 April 2023, and was made available in the UK in October 2023. The drink is brewed by Freetime Beer Co., which was based in Wales. The brewery closed down after nine years.

== Reception and controversies ==
Nothing's products have generally been noted for their distinctive industrial design, transparent aesthetic, and brand identity. Reviewers have highlighted the company's focus on design differentiation and marketing, which have helped it stand out in the highly competitive smartphone market.

At the same time, critics have pointed to challenges related to pricing, software maturity, and competition with larger manufacturers. The Phone (1) in particular was noted for software instability at launch and for delays in rolling out Android updates compared with competitors. Later devices received more positive reception on software stability, though Nothing’s update policy has been regarded as shorter than that of some larger manufacturers.

In August 2025, the company faced criticism when it was discovered that several promotional images shown on in-store demo units of the Phone (3) were in fact licensed images from the stock photo marketplace Stills, rather than photos taken with the device as had been claimed. Analysis of metadata confirmed the images had been captured on professional cameras before the phone’s release. Co-founder Akis Evangelidis stated that the images had been used as placeholders during staging and were mistakenly left on some demo units, calling the incident an "unfortunate oversight".

== Publications ==
- Philpott, Alex; Pardo, Benjamin; Didero, Maria Cristina (2026). Philpott, Alex; Pearce, Oscar; Page, Kester; Slatter, Joe (eds.). The Product Design 100. London: Design Burger. ISBN 978-1-0369-5572-4.
