= Nothing Phone 2 =

2023 Android smartphone produced by Nothing

Nothing Phone (2)
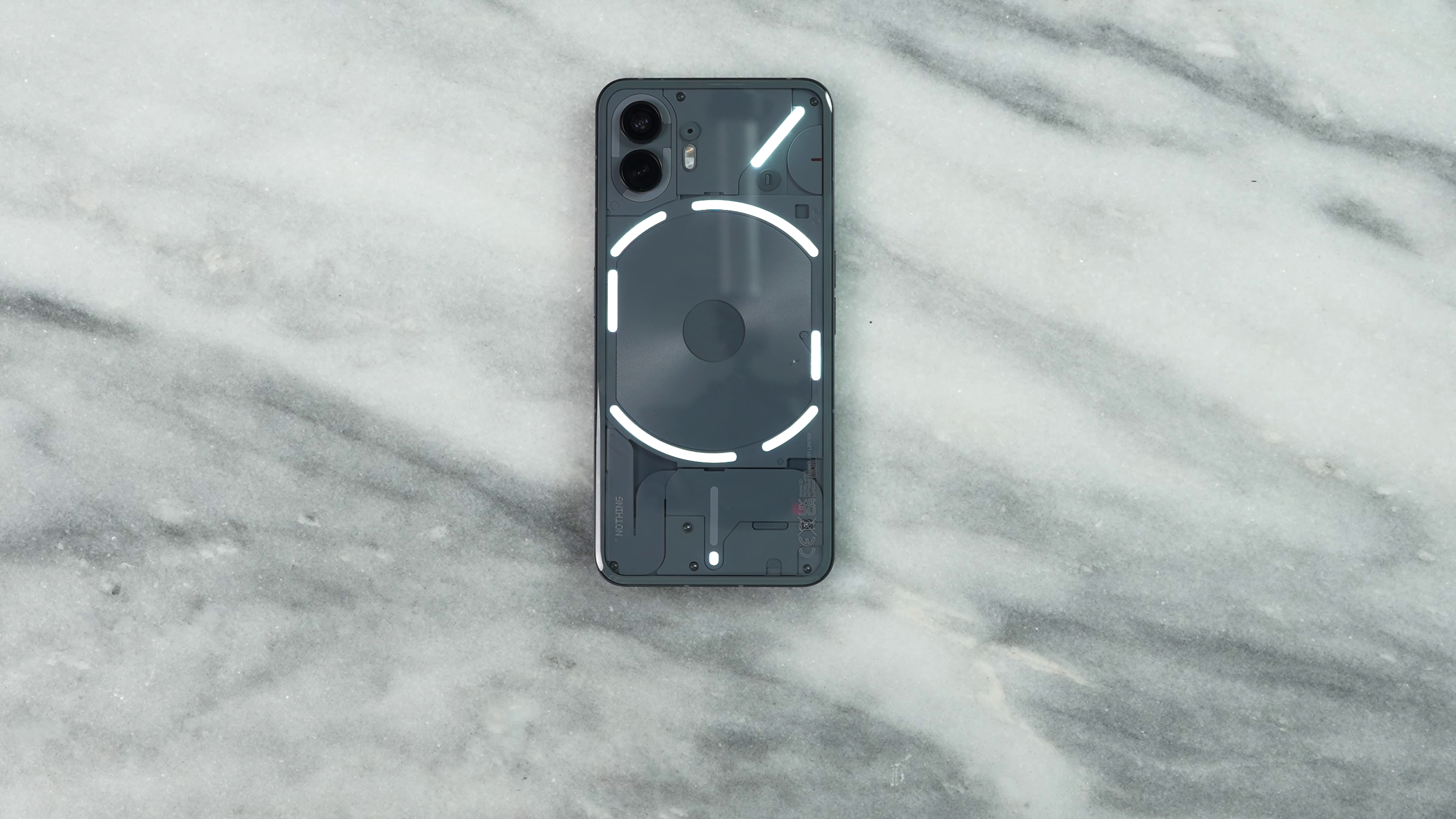
- Rear of the Phone (2) in dark grey
- Manufacturer: Nothing
- Type: Smartphone
- Predecessor: Nothing Phone (1)
- Successor: Nothing Phone 3
- Related: Nothing Phone (2a)
- Compatible networks: 2G, 3G, 4G, and 5G
- Form factor: Slate
- Colors: Dark grey, white
- Dimensions: 162.1 mm (6.38 in) H 76.4 mm (3.01 in) W 8.1 mm (0.32 in) D
- Weight: 201.2 g (7.10 oz)
- Operating system: Android 13
- System-on-chip: Qualcomm Snapdragon 8+ Gen1 UC
- CPU: Octa-core (1x3.0 GHz Cortex-X2 & 3x2.5 GHz Cortex-A710 & 4x1.80 GHz Cortex-A510)
- GPU: Adreno 730
- Memory: 8 and 12 GB RAM
- Storage: 128, 256, 512 GB
- SIM: Dual-SIM
- Battery: 4700 mAh
- Charging: Fast charging up to 45W Qi Wireless Charging Reverse Wireless Charging
- Rear camera: 50 MP, ƒ/1.88, 24mm (main), 1/1.56", 1 μm 50 MP, ƒ/2.2 (ultrawide), 1/2.76" 4K@60fps, 1080p@30/60/480fps
- Front camera: 32 MP, ƒ/2.45 aperture 1080p@30/60fps
- Display: 6.7 in (170 mm), 2412x1080 resolution (394 ppi); LTPO OLED, 1B colors, 120Hz, HDR10+, 1600 nits (HBM), 1600 nits (peak)
- External display: Always-on
- Sound: Dual stereo speakers
- Connectivity: Wi-Fi 802.11 a/b/g/n/ac/6e, dual-band, Wi-Fi Direct; Bluetooth 5.3, A2DP, LE
- Data inputs: Multi-touch screen; USB Type-C 2.0; Fingerprint scanner (optical); Accelerometer; Gyroscope; Proximity sensor; Dual-band GNSS (GPS/GLONASS/BeiDou/Galileo)
- Water resistance: IP54
- Other: Glyph Interface; Glyph Composer
- Website: www.nothing.tech/pages/phone-2

The Nothing Phone (2) is a smartphone by Nothing. The phone was announced on 11 July 2023.

== Hardware ==
=== Physical specifications ===
The phone has IP54 water and dust resistance. The phone charges up to 45W with USB-C, 15W Qi wireless charging, and 5W reverse charging. It has a 4700 mAh battery.

It has a 6.7-inch display. The screen has a 20:9 ratio and a density of 394 PPI. It has a weight of 201.2 grams (7.09 ounces). It has a Corning Gorilla Glass 5 screen, and Gorilla Glass on the back of the phone. The phone supports a 120 Hz display for better smoothness. It also has a dynamic mode which changes refresh rate depending on the type of content being watched on the phone.

The Glyph interface of the phone is found on its back. It has many lights for different purposes. There are 33 different types of LED lights on the glyphs.

The cameras on the phone have two 50 MP dual cameras, and a 32 MP front selfie camera. It is capable of recording at 4K@30 or 60 fps, 1080p@30 and 60 fps. The default setting of the camera shoots at 12.5 MP.

=== Cellular connectivity ===
The Phone (2) is certified to work on AT&T and T-Mobile networks in the United States, but is not certified to work on Verizon due to lack of support for 4G LTE band 13. Despite not being certified, Verizon service is reported by The Verge as working in Brooklyn and Manhattan.

== Software ==
The Phone (2) released with Nothing OS 2.0, which is based on Android 13. It is expected to get three years of Android updates and four years of security updates. The latest version of Nothing OS for the Phone (2) is Nothing OS 3.0; the update includes new features, minor adjustments and bug fixes.
