= Nothing Phone 3 =

2025 Android smartphone produced by Nothing

- Also known as: Phone (3)
- Brand: Nothing
- Developer: Nothing
- Manufacturer: Nothing Technology Limited
- Type: Smartphone
- Series: Phone
- First released: July 2, 2025
- Predecessor: Phone 2
- Compatible networks: 5G, 4G, 3G, 2G; Speed: HSPA, LTE, 5G
- Form factor: Slate
- Colors: White, Black
- Dimensions: 160.6 x 75.6 x 9 (mm)
- Weight: 218 g (8 oz)
- Operating system: Android 15 with Nothing OS 3.5
- System-on-chip: Qualcomm SM8735; Snapdragon 8s Gen 4
- CPU: Octa-core (1x3.21 GHz Cortex-X4 & 3x3.0 GHz Cortex-A720 & 2x2.8 GHz Cortex-A720 & 2x2.0 GHz Cortex-A720)
- GPU: Adreno 825
- Memory: 256GB: 12GB RAM; 512GB: 16GB RAM
- Storage: 256GB & 512GB
- Removable storage: No
- SIM: Dual SIM (Nano SIM), eSIM
- Battery: 5150 mAh (International models); 5500 mAh (Indian models)
- Charging: 65W wired, PD3.0, PPS, QC4, 15W wireless, 7.5W reverse charging, 5W reverse wireless
- Rear camera: Triple: 50+50+50 MP
- Front camera: 50 MP
- Display: Type: OLED, 1B colors, 120Hz, 2160Hz PWM, HDR10+, 4500 nits (peak); Resolutions: 1260 x 2800 pixels, 20:9 ratio Size: 6.67 inches Protection: Corning Gorilla Glass 7i
- Sound: Stereo Speakers
- Data inputs: Fingerprint sensor (Under display)
- Water resistance: IP68: dust and water resistant
- Website: www.nothing.tech/pages/phone-2

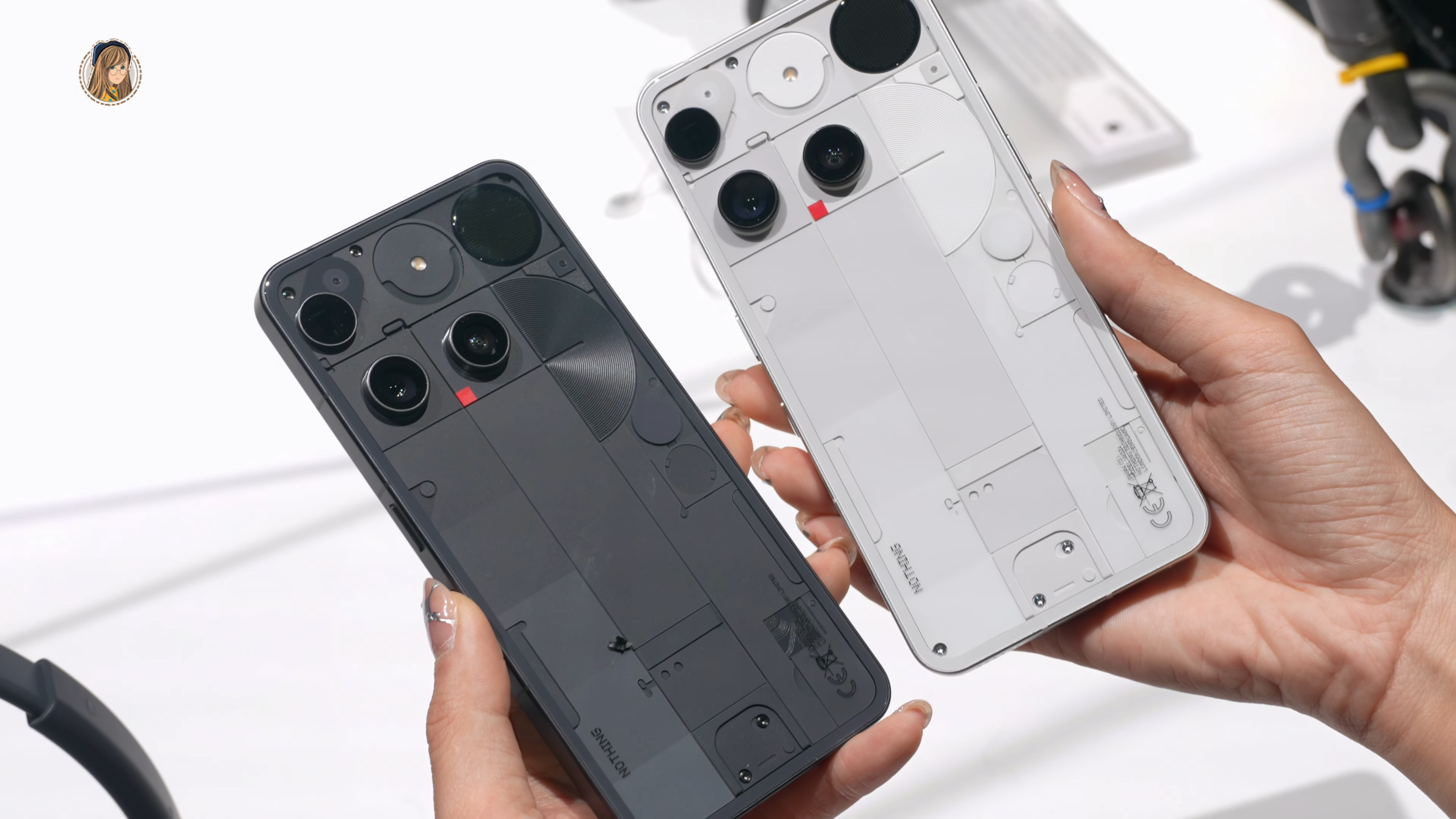
The Nothing Phone 3

The Nothing Phone 3 (stylized as Phone (3)) is an Android smartphone by Nothing Technology Ltd. It is the company's first device marketed as a "flagship" smartphone.

The Phone (3) was officially announced on July 1, 2025, during a launch event in London. Pre-orders for the device began on July 4, 2025, and it became available for general purchase on July 15, 2025. At launch, the phone started at a retail price of $799 in the United States and £799 in the United Kingdom.

== Hardware ==
=== Display ===
The Phone (3) has an AMOLED display with 1 billion colours, 120 hertz refresh rate, 2160 hertz PWM dimming, HDR10+, and can light up to 4000 nits (Note: It is used to measure display brightness. It specifically refers to the amount of light emitted per square meter.) (at its peak).

The Phone (3) has a display size of 6.67 inches (around 16.9 cm) and has a resolution of 1260 x 2800 pixels with a 20:9 ratio and it is protected by Corning Gorilla Glass 7i.

=== Connectivity ===
The Phone (3) supports a wide range of cellular networks, including 2G, 3G, 4G LTE, and 5G. For 5G connectivity, the device is compatible with both Standalone (SA) and Non-Standalone (NSA) architectures, covering bands n1 through n78. Its 4G LTE support includes bands 1 through 71, ensuring broad international coverage. For older network standards, the device supports HSDPA (3G) and quad-band GSM (2G).

The device utilizes the Snapdragon 8s Gen 4 modem, which allows for high-speed data transfers across GSM, HSPA, LTE, and 5G technologies. Additionally, the phone supports Dual SIM functionality with eSIM support, and provides VoLTE and Wi-Fi 7 for improved connection quality.

=== Cameras ===
The Nothing Phone (3) has a triple rear camera system consisting of three 50-megapixel sensors. The primary wide-angle camera utilizes an OmniVision OV50H sensor with a 24mm focal length and an f/1.7 aperture; it is made with both phase detection autofocus (PDAF) and optical image stabilization (OIS). The secondary camera is a 50-megapixel periscope telephoto lens using a Samsung ISOCELL JN5 sensor with an f/2.7 aperture, offering 3x optical zoom and OIS. The third unit is a 50-megapixel Samsung ISOCELL JN1 ultrawide sensor with an f/2.2 aperture and a 114-degree field of view.

The device supports video recording at 4K and 1080p resolutions at both 30 and 60 frames per second. To have stable footage, the system employs a combination of OIS and gyroscope-based electronic image stabilization (gyro-EIS). Additional hardware features include a dual-LED flash, high-dynamic-range (HDR) processing, and a panorama mode. The camera software also includes a "red dot" recording indicator light on the rear of the device, a signature design element carried over from previous models.

The selfie camera of the Phone (3) has a single 50MP camera which supports f/2.2 (wide) and can record videos at 4K at 60 fps and 1080p at 60 fps features HDR.

=== Features ===
The Phone (3) is in two color options: White and Black. The device has an optical under-display fingerprint sensor and a comprehensive suite of sensors, including an accelerometer, proximity sensor, gyroscope, and compass. Wireless connectivity includes support for Bluetooth 6.0 and Near Field Communication (NFC) for mobile payments. The Nothing Phone (3) also features a USB Type-C 2.0 port for data transfer and charging.

=== Battery and charging ===
The Nothing Phone (3) uses silicon-carbon battery technology, with capacity varying by region. The international model is equipped with a 5,150 mAh battery, while the variant sold in India has a larger 5,500 mAh cell.

The Phone (3) supports 65W wired fast charging compatible with Power Delivery 3.0 (PD3.0), Programmable Power Supply (PPS), and Quick Charge 4 (QC4) standards. Wireless charging is supported at 15W, and the device also features reverse charging capabilities: 7.5W through a wired connection and 5W for reverse wireless charging of accessories like the Nothing Ear.

== Software ==
The Phone (3) ships with Nothing OS 3.5, which is based on the Android 15 operating system. Nothing has stated to providing five years of major Android version upgrades and seven years of security patches for the device, which is the longest support policy the company has offered to date.

The software includes features such as a "Glyph Matrix" interface for notifications and an "Essential Space" mode for productivity. The company also confirmed that the device will be among the first to receive the Nothing OS 4.0 update, based on Android 16.

== Reception ==
The Nothing Phone (3) received generally positive reviews from critics, though its claim to being a "flagship" phone was a point of debate. Critics praised the device's unique design and the transition from the LED light strips of previous models to the new "Glyph Matrix" dot-matrix display. The Guardian described the phone as a "slick Android alternative," praising the software experience and the inclusion of a 3x telephoto lens.

Some reviewers criticized the choice of the Snapdragon 8s Gen 4 processor. While performance was noted as good enough for daily tasks, some critics argued that it did not offer the same raw power as the "flagship" chips used by competitors like Samsung or Apple. The display received high marks for its 4,500-nit peak brightness, though the lack of LTPO technology was mentioned as a minor drawback in some reviews.
