= Nothing Phone 1 =

2022 Android smartphone produced by Nothing

Nothing Phone (1)

- Manufacturer: Nothing
- Type: Smartphone
- First released: 12 July 2022
- Successor: Nothing Phone 2
- Compatible networks: GSM, HSPA, LTE, and 5G
- Form factor: Slate
- Colors: White, black
- Dimensions: 159.2 mm × 75.8 mm × 8.3 mm (6.27 in × 2.98 in × 0.33 in)
- Weight: 193.5 g (6.83 oz)
- Operating system: Release: Nothing OS 1.0 (Android 12); Current: Nothing OS 3.2 (Android 15) (as of July 2025)
- System-on-chip: Qualcomm Snapdragon 778G+
- GPU: Adreno 642L
- Memory: 8 or 12 GB LPDDR5
- Storage: 128 or 256 GB UFS 3.1
- SIM: Dual
- Battery: 4500 mAh
- Charging: 33W PD3.0 wired charging; 15W Qi Wireless charging; 5W Reverse charging
- Rear camera: Main: 50 MP, ƒ/1.88, 1/1.56", 1 μm; Ultrawide: 50 MP, ƒ/2.2, 1/2.76"; Both: HDR, Night Mode, 4K@30 fps, 1080p@30/60 fps,
- Front camera: 16 MP, ƒ/2.45, 1/3.1"; 1080p@30 fps
- Display: 6.55 in (166 mm) OLED touchscreen with HDR10+ support with a 120 Hz refresh rate
- Sound: Dual stereo speakers
- Connectivity: Bluetooth 5.2; Wi-Fi a/b/g/n/ac/ax
- Data inputs: Fingerprint scanner (optical); Accelerometer; Gyroscope; Proximity sensor; Dual-band GNSS (GPS/GLONASS/BeiDou/Galileo)
- Water resistance: IP53
- Website: www.nothing.tech/products/phone-1

The Nothing Phone (1), stylised as Phone (1) is an Android smartphone by Nothing. The phone was announced on 23 March 2022 and went on sale on 21 July 2022.

== History ==
Nothing was founded in October 2020. It was announced on January 27, 2021, by former OnePlus co-founder Carl Pei, three months after Pei had left OnePlus. The goal of the new company was to "remove barriers between people and technology to create a seamless digital future." While no product was announced at the time, the company announced that new products from the company would be released later in the year.

After Nothing released their first product, the Ear (1), Nothing announced a partnership with Qualcomm, which will allow them to use their Snapdragon chips in their future devices.

Speculation on Nothing's first smartphone began to rise in March 2022 during the Mobile World Congress in Barcelona, when the company showed its prototype to executives, including Qualcomm. After securing up to $70 million in Series B financing, Nothing announced its 23 March keynote, at which it would announce its first smartphone.

On 20 June 2022, Nothing revealed the design of the Nothing Phone (1) at the Art Basel Show in Basel, Switzerland. Nothing also confirmed that another event would take place on 12 July to announce additional information regarding the Phone (1), including pricing and specs.

On 12 July 2022, the phone was released during an online event. The phone's slogan was “Pure Instinct”.

=== Release ===
Nothing has announced partnerships with O2 in the United Kingdom, Deutsche Telekom in Germany, and Flipkart in India to release the phone, with the phone to be released exclusively in the UK on O2 and Germany on Deutsche Telekom. When asked about releasing the phone to the North American market, the company confirmed that the phone would not be released in North America. Although the company has confirmed that Nothing has plans to release a smartphone for the North American market, the Phone (1) will instead be distributed to private investors through a closed beta program.

Pre-orders for the UK and Germany began on 24 June 2022, via invitation only with private community members going first, with customers who wanted to pre-order the phone required to pay £20/€20 to purchase the phone by July. In January 2023, Nothing announced a United States launch as a “beta program” to test the release of Android 13 on the device; “beta members” will pay US$299 and receive a phone with limited connectivity on US networks.

== Design ==
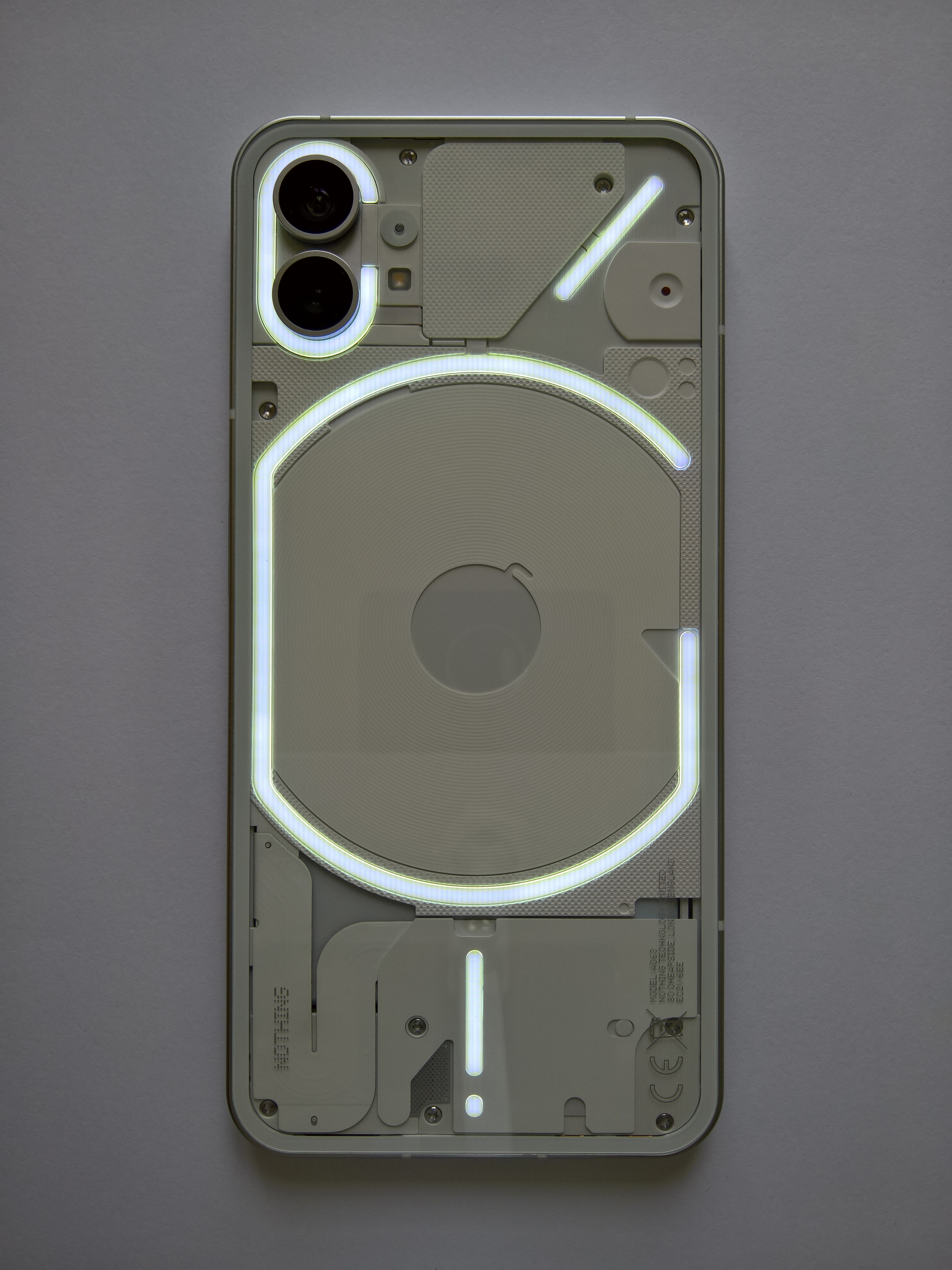
Glyph Interface on the back of the phone

The Phone (1) features a transparent design, similar to that of the company's other products, such as the Nothing Ear (1). It has flat sides, similar to the iPhone 12, and an IP53 splash, water, and dust resistance rating.

The design features 900 small LEDs on the back which uses the Glyph Interface to make the rear LEDs light up in sync with the phone sounds. These 'glyph lights' also light up to show the phone's charging status. The phone's frame consists of recycled aluminium with additional plastic components that are 50% made from bio-based or post-consumer recycled materials. The display is protected by Gorilla Glass 5 and the phone is covered with Gorilla Glass 6. There is an in-display fingerprint sensor as well.

The phone has stereo speakers but does not come with a headphone jack. The phone supports Bluetooth 5.2 and NFC capabilities. The phone comes in white and black colours.

== Hardware ==
The Phone (1) is powered by the Qualcomm Snapdragon 778G+ processor and has a 6.5-inch 1080×2400 resolution punch hole display screen with a 120 Hz refresh rate. The screen can get as bright as 1200 nits and supports displaying 1 billion colours. The phone has a 4500 mAh battery, with 33W charging, which is capable of charging the phone from 0 to 50% in 30 minutes and a full charge in 70 minutes. It also features 15W wireless charging, 5W reverse-wireless charging, and supports Quick Charge 4.0 and Power Delivery 3.0 up to 33W. It can be configured with either 8+128, 8+256, or 12+256 RAM and storage configurations. It also features a RAM booster using 8 GB, so it can go up to 20 GB of RAM.

The phone has dual 50 MP main and ultra-wide cameras. The main camera supports both optical image stabilisation and electronic image stabilisation and is capable of recording 4K video at 30 fps and FHD video at 60 fps. The phone does not have a dedicated telephoto lens, and instead uses digital zoom to take close-up shots. There is a red LED on the back of the phone that lights up when video is recorded.

== Software ==
The Phone (1) initially shipped with Nothing OS 1, based on Android 12. The phone will receive at least three years of software updates and four years of security updates.

Nothing OS 1.5, based on Android 13, was released to the Phone (1) on 16 February 2023, with a new weather app, more Glyph Interface options, and improvements to the camera interface, and other features, including improvements to the performance and other Android 13 features, like a QR code reader and new media controls. It was officially released to the public on 22 February 2023, via a press release by Nothing. Tech Outlook leaked the new OS one day before its launch, which was on 21 February 2023."

Nothing OS 2.0, still based on Android 13, was released on 28 August 2023, new features includes a monochromatic icon pack and updating the Glyph Interface to version 2. Glyph Torch can be used as a flashlight, and essential Notifications allows select contacts and apps to leave a persistent notification.

Nothing OS 2.5, based on Android 14 was released for the Phone (1) on 31 January 2024, with improved customisation, new widgets, updated quick settings, easier access to music visualisation on the Glyph Interface, and stability improvements.

Nothing OS 3.0, based on Android 15 was released on 16 January 2025 as the Phone (1)'s final major Android upgrade. New features include shared widgets, Nothing Gallery, and another redesigned quick settings.

== Reception ==
Engadget named the phone "a very remarkable Android mid-ranger". The attention to detail in the phone was praised. Overall, they gave it a rating of 88/100.

Many early purchasers have complained about green tinting and dead pixels on their screens. Nothing stated that they would calibrate the display effect in an upcoming software update; they also encouraged affected customers to contact customer support and request replacements.

The Nothing Phone (1) received a very low repairability score of 4 out of 10 in a video review.

== Glyph interface ==
Glyph bug

Glyph molitor

Glyph pepelu

Glyph karha

Glyph radiate

Glyph beetle

Glyph pneumatic
