= Carl Pei =

Swedish entrepreneur (born 1989)

- 裴宇
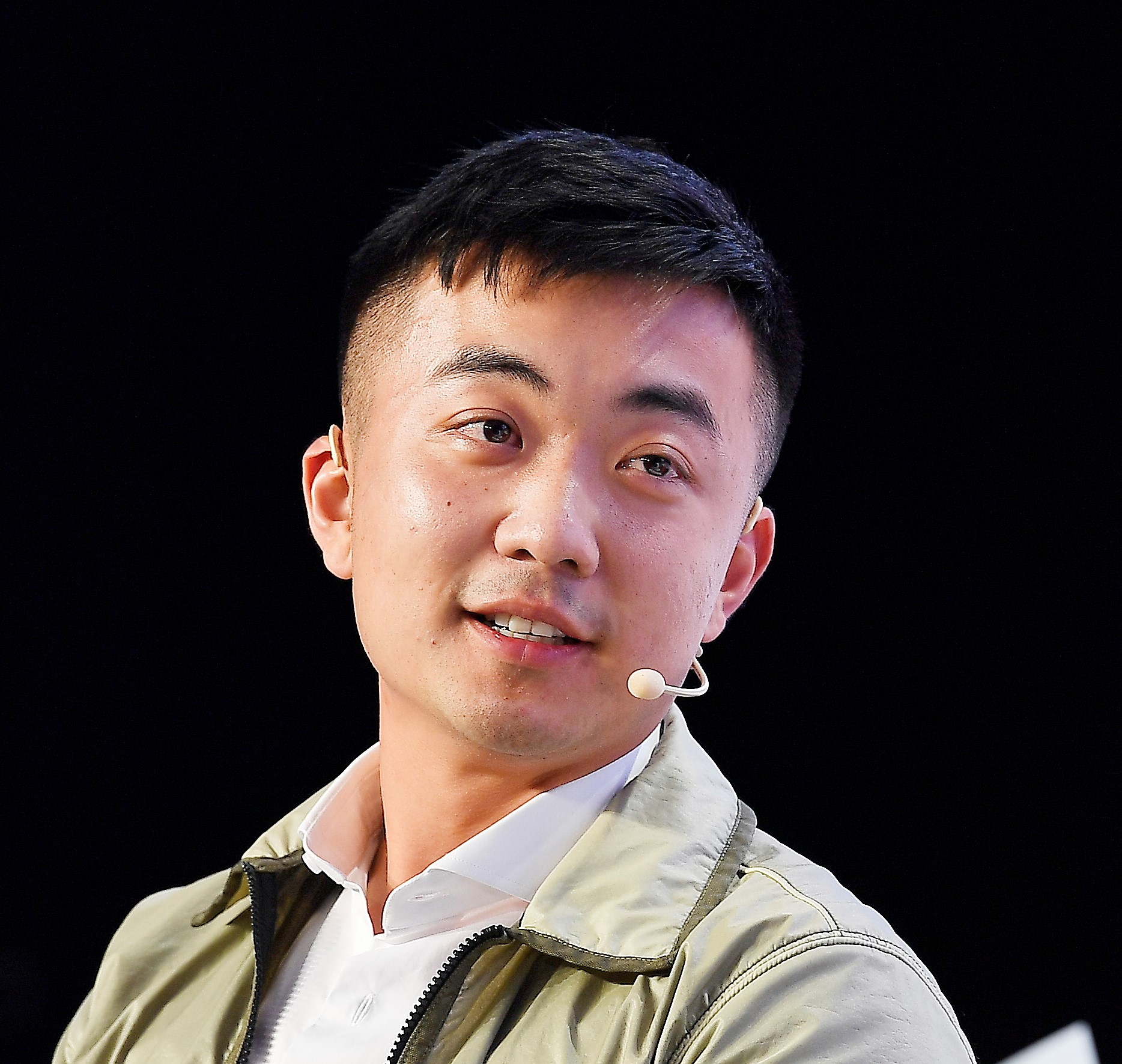
- Pei in 2019
- Born: 11 September 1989 (age 37); Beijing, China
- Citizenship: Sweden
- Education: Stockholm School of Economics (dropped out)
- Occupation: Entrepreneur
- Known for: Founder of Nothing; Co-Founder of OnePlus
- Title: CEO of Nothing
- Awards: Forbes 30 Under 30 list for his influence in the technology industry. and in 2019, he was included in the 2019 edition of the Fortune Fortune 40 Under 40 list .

Carl Pei Yu (Chinese: 裴宇; pinyin: Péi Yǔ; born 11 September 1989) is a Swedish entrepreneur. He co-founded OnePlus along with Pete Lau in 2013 and was the director of OnePlus Global. He left the firm in October 2020 and founded Nothing, where he is CEO.

== Early life ==
Pei was born in 1989 in Beijing, China; his family soon moved to the United States, and then to Sweden, where Pei grew up. He pursued a Bachelor of Science degree in 2008 at the Stockholm School of Economics, but he dropped out in 2011 to work full-time in the Chinese smartphone industry.

== Career ==
Pei interned at Nokia in 2010, and he worked at the company for three months. After Nokia, the fan website Pei had created about Meizu had caught the attention of that company's Hong Kong branch, and Pei started working in Meizu's marketing team in 2011.

In November 2012, he joined Oppo as its international markets manager, where he worked directly under Pete Lau.

== OnePlus ==
Pei co-founded OnePlus with Pete Lau in Shenzhen, Guangdong in December 2013. Their first device, the OnePlus One, sold close to a million units in 2014, despite a sales target of only 50,000. In July 2015, Pei presented the OnePlus 2 through a virtual reality video on YouTube. It was claimed to be the first product launch in virtual reality, and it has been viewed over 1,522,495 times as of May 2025. After the unveiling of the OnePlus 3 in June 2016, Pei claimed it was the company's most popular smartphone, based on the Net Promoter Score. When asked in November 2016, Pei said the reason for the upgrade after only three months was because they did not want to wait to improve the hardware. Pei claimed the OnePlus 5 to be their fastest-selling device to date shortly after its release in June 2017.

Pei oversaw the design and marketing of OnePlus devices until leaving the company in October 2020.

== Nothing ==
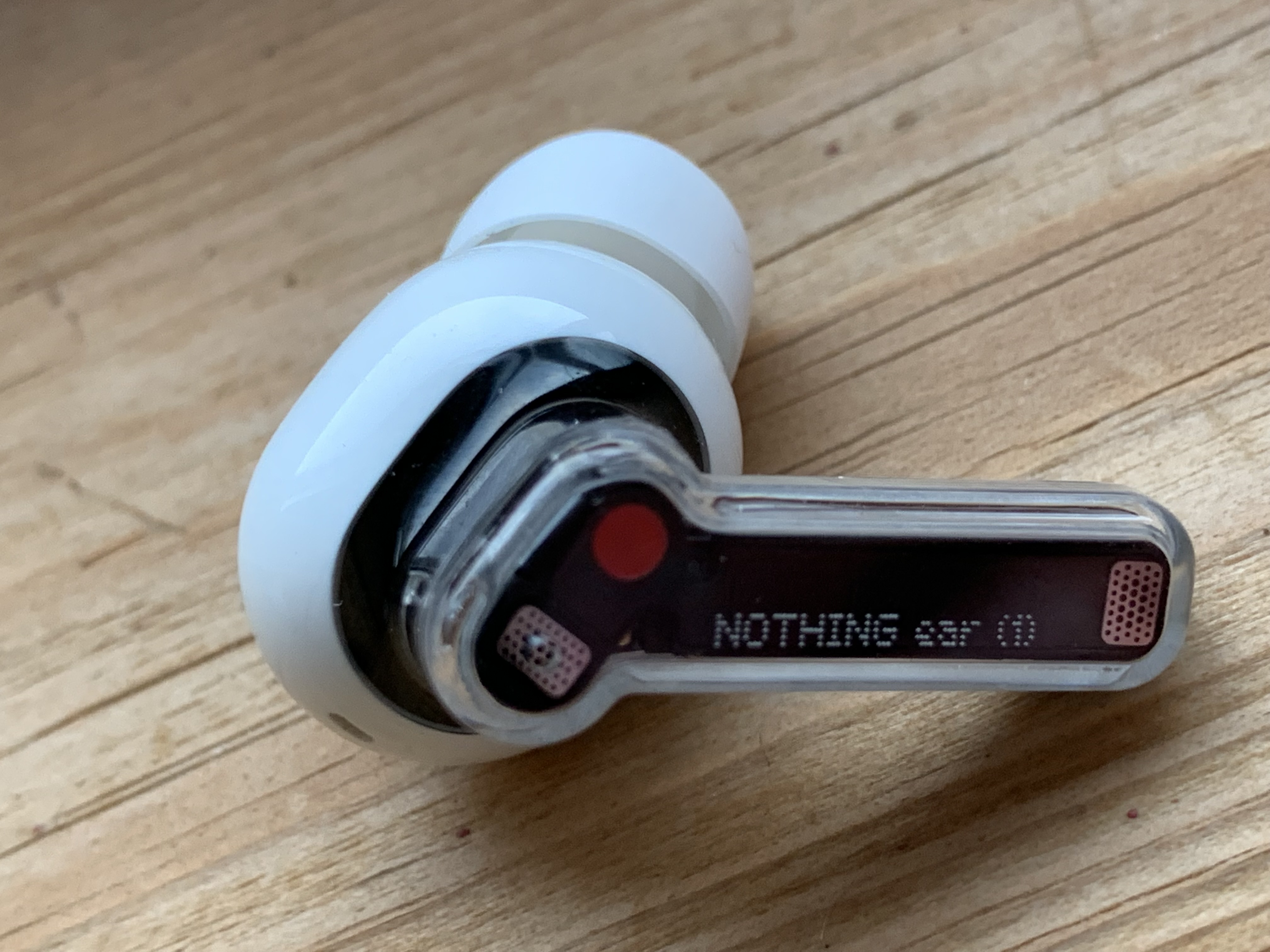
The Nothing ear (1)

Following his departure from OnePlus, Pei announced Nothing on 27 January 2021. According to Pei, Nothing’s mission is to remove barriers between people and technology to create a seamless digital future. The company is based in London and landed a number of notable investors, such as iPod inventor Tony Fadell, Twitch co-founder Kevin Lin, Reddit CEO Steve Huffman, and YouTuber Casey Neistat. On 25 February, the company announced Teenage Engineering as founding partners, mainly responsible for the design aesthetic of the brand and its products.

Nothing's first product "ear (1)" was launched on 27 July 2021.

On 23 March 2022, Nothing announced its first smartphone, the "Nothing Phone 1” with an anticipated release date of Summer 2022. It released on 21 July 2022 to overall positive reception. Critics praised the premium and innovative design and ‘glyph’ system, the display, and overall value for money. They were more critical of the quality of the cameras, and disappointing battery life, though reviewers have stated both have improved since with software updates.

On 28 February 2023 Carl Pei announced that in their next Nothing smartphone, they would be partnering with Qualcomm for their eighth generation chipsets for their next smartphone.

Nothing announced and released the Nothing Ear (2) wireless earbuds on 22 March 2023 to generally positive reviews, particularly for the improvements upon the flaws of the previous model. Pei's team led the market April 2024 by shipping a "first-of-its-kind integration" of ChatGPT for users of a paired Nothing phone and Nothing earbuds.

Nothing further went ahead to launch their own subbrand, CMF, which prices its phones at a more accessible pricepoint.

== Publicity ==
In July 2015, during an interview by The Wall Street Journal about how OnePlus was created, Pei stated, "...we looked at all the Android phones on the market and there wasn't one phone that was good enough for us ourselves to use." In 2014 and 2015, he told The New York Times and Forbes that "OnePlus wasn’t meant to become a global company at the beginning. The main focus was taking on the Chinese market. ... for the global markets team, we are a bunch of young people without a lot of experience. It was just like an experiment, 'Hey, do the global markets and see what happens. Do whatever you want.' We call our group 'a Shenzhen within our company', or a start-up within a bigger company." And "Very soon our sales outside of China will surpass sales in China."

== Awards ==
In April 2016, Pei was included in the 2016 edition of the Marketing Week Vision 100 list. In January 2016, he was included in the 2016 edition of the Forbes 30 Under 30 list for his influence in the technology industry. and in 2019, he was included in the 2019 edition of the Fortune Fortune 40 Under 40 list.
