= Nothing Phone 2a/2a Plus =

2024 Android smartphone produced by Nothing

Nothing Phone (2a) Nothing Phone (2a) Plus
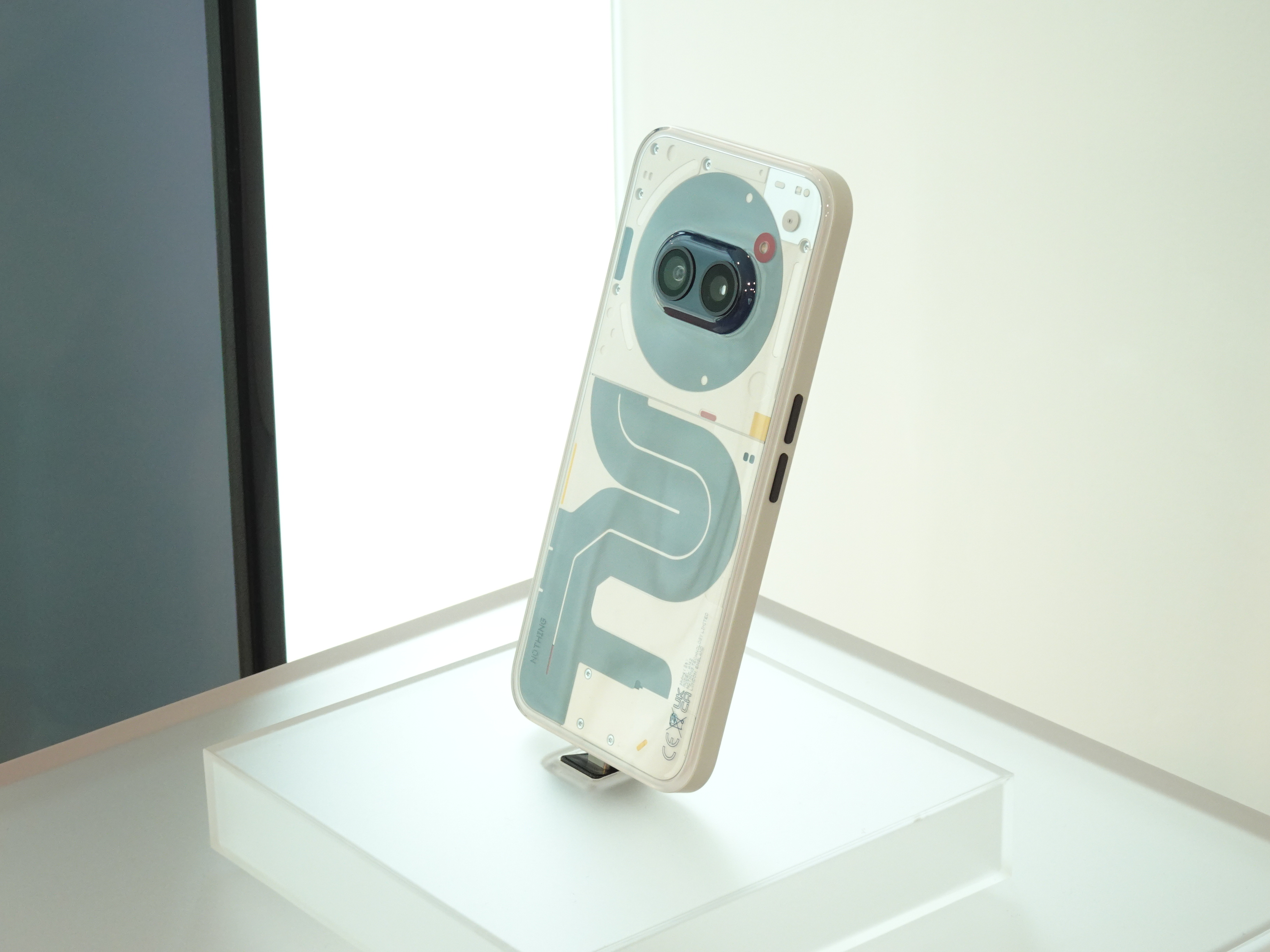
- The back of the Phone (2a) Community Edition
- Also known as: Phone (2a): Nothing Phone 2a Phone (2a) Plus: Nothing Phone 2a Plus
- Manufacturer: Nothing
- Type: Phablet
- Series: Phone
- First released: 12 March 2024; 2 years ago
- Related: Nothing Phone 2
- Compatible networks: 2G, 3G, 4G, 5G
- Form factor: Slate
- Colors: Black, White, Milk, Blue, Bauhaus
- Dimensions: 161.74 mm (6.368 in) H 76.32 mm (3.005 in) W 8.55 mm (0.337 in) D
- Weight: 190 g (6.7 oz)
- Operating system: Original: Phone (2a): Android 14 with Nothing OS 2.5; Phone (2a) Plus: Android 14 with Nothing OS 2.6; Current Android 16 with Nothing OS 4.1
- System-on-chip: Phone (2a): MediaTek Dimensity 7200 Pro; Phone (2a) Plus: MediaTek Dimensity 7350 Pro
- Memory: 8 and 12 GB RAM
- Storage: Phone (2a): 128, 256 GB; Phone (2a) Plus: 256 GB
- SIM: Dual-SIM (Nano-SIM)
- Battery: Non-removable, 5000 mAh
- Charging: Phone (2a): fast charging up to 45 W Phone (2a) Plus: fast charging up to 50 W
- Data inputs: Multi-touch screen; USB Type-C 2.0; Fingerprint scanner (optical); Accelerometer; Gyroscope; Proximity sensor; Dual-band GNSS (GPS/GLONASS/BeiDou/Galileo)
- Model: Phone (2a): A142; Phone (2a) Plus: A142P
- Codename: Phone (2a): Pacman; Phone (2a) Plus: PacmanPro

The Nothing Phone (2a) and Nothing Phone (2a) Plus are Android-based smartphones by Nothing. The base model was announced on 5 March 2024 and released on 12 March 2024. The Nothing Phone 2a surpassed 100,000 units sold in its first day after release.

The main differences between the Nothing Phone (2a) and Nothing Phone (2a) Plus are their colour options, chipsets, charging power, and front-facing cameras.

== Specifications ==
=== Hardware ===
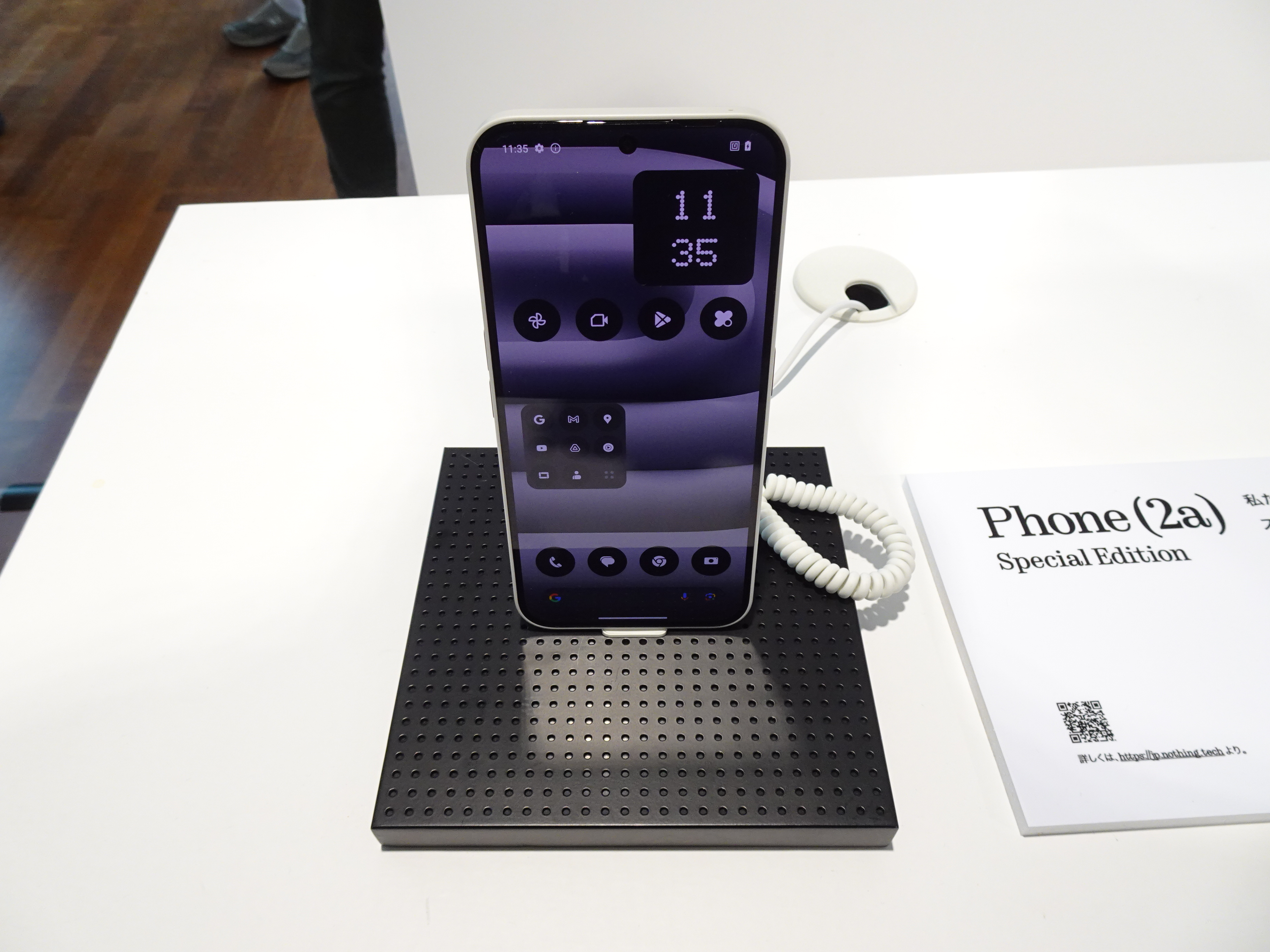
The front of the Phone (2a)

The front of the smartphone is made of Corning Gorilla Glass 5, the frame is made of matte plastic, and the back is made of glance transparent plastic.

The smartphones weigh 190 grams (6.7 oz) and have a thickness of 8.55 mm (0.337 in). On the bottom side, there is a dual SIM tray, a microphone, a USB-C port, and a speaker and on the top, there is an additional microphone. On the left and right sides, there are the volume buttons and the power button, respectively. There are three arrays of LED lights on the back, called Glyph Interface. IP54 rated — splash, water, and dust resistant. There are four color options for the Nothing Phone (2a): black, white, milk, and blue.

The Phone (2a) features a MediaTek Dimensity 7200 Pro chipset, while the Phone (2a) Plus is equipped with Dimensity 7350 Pro, which is basically an overclocked Dimensity 7200 Pro. Both chipsets are built on a 4 nm fabrication process and include a Mali-G610 MC4 GPU. The Phone (2a) features three memory configurations: 8/128 GB 8/256 GB, and 12/256 GB. The Plus model lacks an 8/128 GB memory configuration.

Both phones are equipped with a non-removable 5000 mAh battery. The Phone (2a) supports 45 W fast charging, while the Phone (2a) Plus supports slightly faster 50 W fast charging.

The phones feature 6.7 inches (170 mm) AMOLED display with a Full HD+ (1080×2412 pixels) resolution, a 20:9 aspect ratio, a 120 Hz refresh rate, a peak brightness at 1300 nits and a hole cutout for the front facing camera in the top-centre.

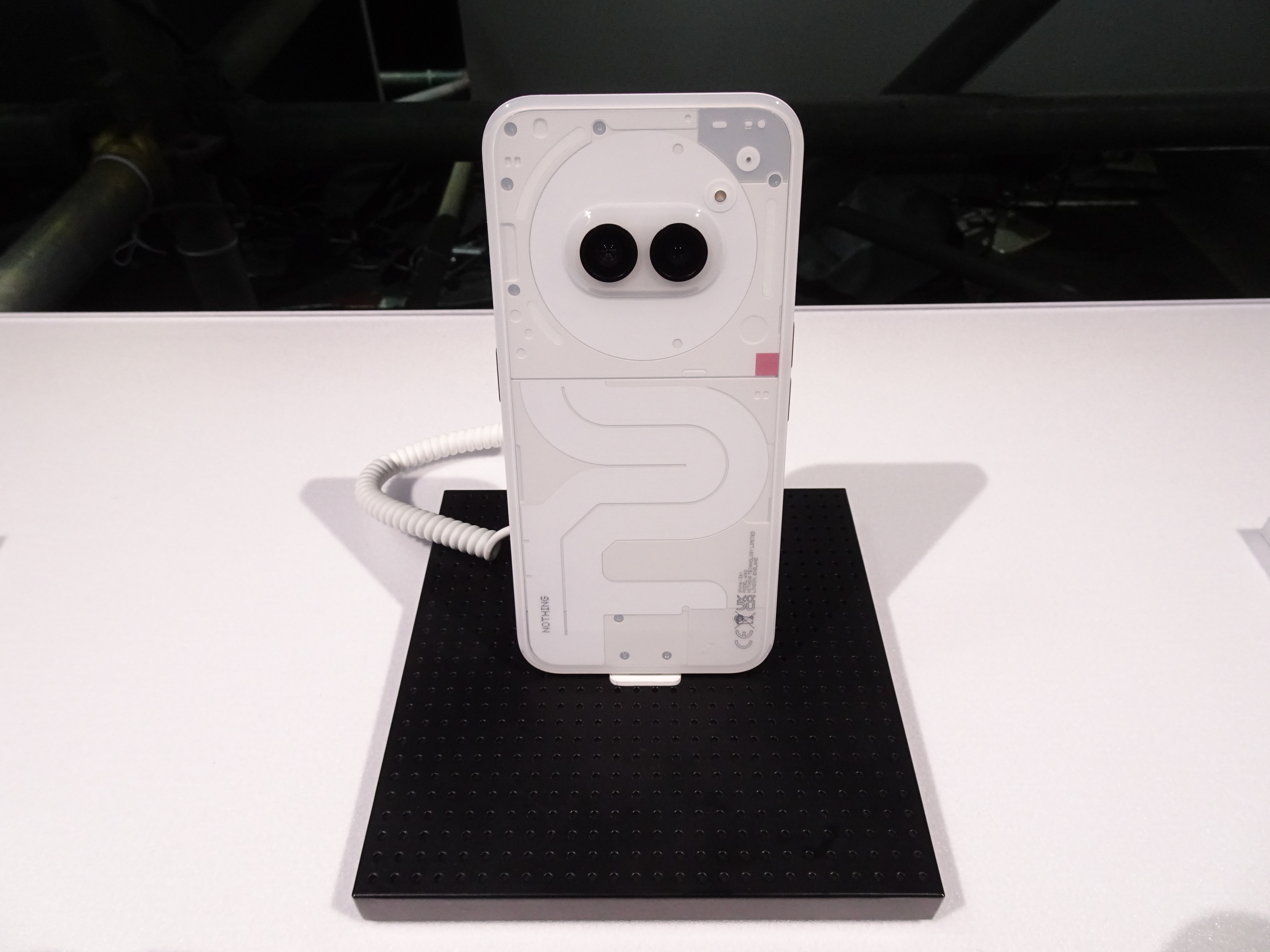
Nothing phone 2a showcase

The smartphones feature a dual rear-facing camera setup, which includes a 50 MP Samsung ISOCELL GN9 wide-angle lens with an f/1.88 aperture, phase-detection autofocus, and optical image stabilisation, as well as a 50 MP Samsung ISOCELL JN1 ultrawide-angle lens with an f/2.2 aperture and a 114° field of view. Additionally, the Phone (2a) features a 32 MP Sony IMX615 front-facing camera with an f/2.2 aperture, while the Phone (2a) Plus features a 50 MP Samsung ISOCELL JN1 front-facing camera with an f/2.2 aperture, which is the same sensor used in ultra-wide rear-facing lens. A rear-facing camera of both smartphones and a front-facing camera of the Phone (2a) Plus have the ability to record videos at up to 4K@30fps, while a front-facing camera of the Phone (2a) have the ability to record videos at up to 1080p at 60fps.

=== Software ===
The Phone (2a) comes out of the box with Nothing OS 2.5 installed, while the Plus model comes with Nothing OS 2.6 installed. Both user interfaces are based on Android 14. Later, both models were updated to Nothing OS 3.0, which is based on Android 15, then Nothing OS 4.0 based on Android 16 in late 2025.
