= RL78 =

Microcontroller

RL78 Family microcontrollers
General information
- Launched: 2010; 16 years ago
- Discontinued: current
- Common manufacturer: Renesas Electronics

Performance
- Max. CPU clock rate: 32 kHz to 40 MHz
- Data width: 16
- Address width: 20

Physical specifications
- Cores: 1

Architecture and classification
- Application: Embedded, home appliances, automotive
- Microarchitecture: RL78-S1 (8-bit), RL78-S2 (16-bit), RL78-S3 (16-bit)
- Instruction set: RL78 Family
- Number of instructions: 74 (RL78-S1), 75 (RL78-S2), 81 (RL78-S3)

History
- Predecessor: 78K0R

RL78 is a family of 16-bit CPU cores for embedded microcontrollers that Renesas Electronics introduced in 2010.

== Architecture ==
The RL78 family is an accumulator-based register-bank CISC instruction set architecture (ISA). Although it has eight 8-bit registers or four 16-bit register pairs, essentially all arithmetic operations are performed on a single accumulator (the A register or AX register pair). Its basic ISA is succeeded from 78K0R, which has 75 same instructions out of 80. It has a 20-bit (1 megabyte) address space.

Special-purpose registers consist of:

- 20-bit program counter PC
- 16-bit stack pointer SP. This is always 2-byte aligned.
- 8-bit program status word PSW. This includes a carry flag (borrow bit on subtract), auxiliary carry flag and zero flag, but not a negative flag or overflow flag. The former is unnecessary, as it is possible to branch on the most significant bit of the accumulator directly, but the lack of the latter makes signed comparisons awkward. The PSW also includes an interrupt enable bit (IE bit) which controls whether interrupts are enabled (IE=1) or disabled (IE=0), with the exception of NMI.
- Two 4-bit segment registers, describes below.

Data addressing is mostly 16-bit, with all RAM and special function registers located in the high 64 KB of the address space (0xF0000–0xFFFFF), and data accesses defaulting to that region. Access to other regions of the address space uses an "ES" prefix opcode, indicating that the high four address bits should come from a special "extra segment" register instead.

The basic 2-operand ALU operations come in the following forms:

- A, #immediate (A ← A op immediate)
- A, register (A ← A op register)
- register, A (register ← register op A)
- A, addr8 (A ← A op [addr8], range limited to special function registers)
- A, addr16 (A ← A op [addr16], ES: prefix optional)
- A, [HL] (A ← A op [HL], ES: prefix optional)
- A, [HL+byte] (A ← A op [HL+byte], ES: prefix optional)
- A, [HL+B] (A ← A op [HL+B], ES: prefix optional)
- A, [HL+C] (A ← A op [HL+C], ES: prefix optional)

Code addresses, in contrast, default to the low portion of the address space where the ROM is located. Control transfer instructions (jump and call) allow a 20-bit address to be specified, while indirect control transfers use the concatenation of a 16-bit register address and a 4-bit "code segment" register. Unlike the 8086 microprocessor, there are no separate near and far return instructions; all subroutine calls push the full 20-bit return address.

The architecture is consistently little-endian, with all multi-bytes values appearing least significant byte.

== Microarchitectures ==
RL78 family processors have 3-stage instruction pipelining. Most models have four register banks which may be selected quickly.

RL78 has three microarchitecture variants as follows.

μ-Arch	ALU	Registers	Instructions	Pipeline	Remark	Documents
RL78-S3	16-bit	8× 8-bit ×4 banks	81 (75+6)	3-stage	μ-arch variants	
RL78-S2	16-bit	8× 8-bit ×4 banks	75	3-stage	μ-arch variants	
RL78-S1	8-bit	8× 8-bit (no bank)	74 (75-1)	3-stage	μ-arch variants	
78K0R	16-bit	8× 8-bit ×4 banks	80 (75+5)	3-stage	Direct predecessor Extended 78K/0	
78K0S	8-bit	8× 8-bit (no bank)	47	none	Simplified 78K/0	
78K0	8-bit	8× 8-bit ×4 banks	48	none	Basic 78K/0 core	

== Applications ==
RL78 covers wide range of application area for mechanical system controls and for user interfaces.

=== Grouping ===
RL78 Family is divided into some groups, those have unique naming rules.

- G1x: For general purpose use
- L1x: For segment LCD controls
- I1x: Mainly for industrial use
- F1x: For automotive use
- D1x: Specially designed for automotive customers only

=== Application examples ===
RL78 is suitable for consumer electronics, such as major appliances (including; washing machines, clothes dryers, dishwashers, refrigerators, and air conditioners), small appliances (including; power tools, vacuum cleaners, and coffeemakers), and medical devices (including; electronic toothbrushes, blood glucose meters, holter monitors). It is also used for factory automation infrastructure (including; sensors, gauges, and actuators), and energy conservation (including; smart meters, inverter compressors, and lighting control systems).

For automotive industry, low-power and size constrained applications are ideally suited to RL78's automotive dedicated communication interfaces, such as CAN, LIN, and IEBus, and brushless DC electric motor solutions. Three special grade of maximum ambient temperature, 105 °C (221 °F), 125 °C (257 °F), and 150 °C (302 °F), are available for some products.

== History ==
RL78 (130nm MF3 flash process) was the first new MCU to emerge from the new Renesas Electronics company from the merger of NEC Electronics and Renesas Technology and incorporated the features of the NEC 78K0R (150nm MF2 flash process) and Renesas Technology R8C microcontrollers. The RL78 core variants include the S1, S2, and S3 type cores which evolved from the NEC 78K0R core. The basic S1 core support 74 instructions, the S2 core adds register banking and supports 75 instructions, while the S3 core adds an on-chip multiplier / divider / multiple-accumulate and supports 81 instructions.

The RL78 was developed to address extremely low power but highly integrated microcontroller applications, to this end the core offered a novel low power mode of operation called “snooze mode” where the ADC or serial interface can be programmed to meet specific conditions to wake the device from the extreme low power STOP mode of 0.52uA.

== Software and development tools ==
RL78 Family is supported with a various range of hardware and software development tools.

=== Compilers and IDEs ===
The GNU Compiler Collection, Renesas CS+ (formerly CubeSuite+), Renesas e^{2}studio (based on Eclipse), and IAR Systems' compiler and development environment are available. The Renesas CS+ IDE is free for debug-only use and supports standard ELF executable files. The RL78 ABI defined by Renesas is compatible with IAR's V2 and higher compilers.

=== Real-time operating systems ===
Regarding real-time operating systems, CMX Systems, Inc.'s CMX-RTX, Micrium, Inc.'s μC/OS-II and MicroC/OS-III, ITRON OS Segger Microcontroller Systems' embOS, FreeRTOS, and ChibiOS/RT are supported.

=== Code generating tools ===
Renesas provides a free code generating tool named APPLIcation LEading Tool (Applilet).

=== Flash ROM programming libraries ===
Renesas provides free self-programming libraries; Code Flash Libraries (CFL) and Data Flash Libraries (DFL). A EEPROM Emulation Library (EEL) is also available for the data-flash to add wear leveling and robustness. Different classes of DFL and EEL are available to match application needs including the standard T01 type, "Tiny" T02 type, and "Pico" T04 type (DFL-only).

=== In-circuit emulators ===
Several companies provide on-chip debuggers and full-spec in-circuit emulators. Renesas makes on-chip debuggers as well as third-parties, such as Lauterbach and iSystems. Renesas and iSystems supply full-spec in-circuit emulators.

=== On-chip device programming tools ===
Device programming can be achieved by using the on-chip debug port or by using the special serial programming mode of the devices. Renesas supports the serial programming mode with debug tools via the Renesas Flash Programmer (RFP) and the stand-alone programmers; PG-FP5 and PG-FP6, while several third-parties support RL78 with their own device programmers.

== Variants ==
RL78 Family has a range of devices from 20pin with 16K Byte flash memory to 128pin with 512K Byte flash memory.

=== RL78/G13 ===
RL78/G13 integrates a +/- 1% accuracy on-chip oscillator, watch dog timer, RTC, power-on reset, low voltage detection, 26 channels of 10bit ADC, 16x16 Multiplier, 32/32 Divider, I2C, CSI/SPI, UART, LIN, multi-function timer array and also built-in IEC 60730 safety support in hardware. This combination of elements enables the system designer to achieve high performance (41DMIPS) systems operating at very low power levels and at low cost due to the high level of integration in the microcontroller.

=== RL78/G12 ===
G12 is a smaller version of G13 introduced in 2012. RL78/G12. Introduced with 20, 24, and 30-pin packages with 2 KB to 16 KB small size flash memory although providing the G13 functionality with integrated +/- 1% 24 MHz oscillator, reset circuit, a low voltage detection circuit, watchdog timer, data flash with background operation, and including functional safety, on-chip with A/D converter testing function.

This small device is designated for use as a sub-microcontroller suitable for use as in small home appliances and general consumer electronic devices.

=== RL78/G14 ===
In 2012 an addition to the RL78 family was introduced called the G14. This device offers higher levels of integration with the inclusion of additional multiply and divide and multiply-accumulate instructions capable of faster processing than the RL78/G13, 2 Channel 8-bit D/A, 2 Channel comparator, and timer array making it suitable for motor control applications.

- Multi-function Timer Array Unit (TAU):
- Timer array with encoder function
- Timer array unit (16-bit, 8 ch)
- Interval timer (12 bit, 1 ch)
- Watchdog timer (17-bit, 1 ch)
- Full real time calendar function
- Motor control timer (16-bit, 8 ch)
- Phase timer (16-bit, 2 ch)
- I/O timer (16-bit, 1 ch)

=== RL78/I1A ===
An application specific version (ASSP) of the RL78 core was introduced in 2012 for controlling lighting systems, this device was named the RL78/I1A. Specific features of the device such as special PWM timers enable fine dimming, lighting sequence and colour temperature control with power factor correction of the power supply. In addition integrated communication functions for DALI, DMX512 and multiple sensor & user interface controls are provided. Applications for the RL78/I1A include: building automation, LED drivers, lighting controls, fluorescent ballasts, emergency lighting, HID ballasts, digital power supplies, low-cost inverter controls.

=== RL78/L12 ===
Microcontroller series with LCD Drive

Entering mass production at the beginning of 2013, the RL78/L12 includes integrated LCD drive capability for 35 segments x 8 or 39 segments x 4. Three alternative LCD drive methods mat be enabled: split capacitor, capacitive charge pump or external split resistor. With the split capacitor method a low power LCD drive of 0.6uA at 3V can be achieved. Selectable functions (Seg or I/O) for every segment pin, and drive for both glass and panel.

=== RL78/F1x ===
Automotive Microcontrollers

The RL78 F12, F13, F14, & F15 devices replaced the original NEC 78K0R/Fx3 devices with many updates including die shrink, faster core speed (32MHz), improved on-chip debug capability, new peripherals, safety features, and expanded package and memory options. The application note r01an2639ej can be used as a guide when migrating from 78K0R/Fx3 to RL78/F1x.

== See also ==
- 78K
- H8 Family
- V850
- IEBus
