= 78K =

Microcontroller family

78K Family microcontrollers
General information
- Launched: 1986; 40 years ago
- Discontinued: current
- Common manufacturer: Renesas Electronics (formerly NEC)

Performance
- Max. CPU clock rate: 32 kHz to 24 MHz
- Data width: 16/8
- Address width: 20(24)/16

Physical specifications
- Cores: 1

Architecture and classification
- Application: Embedded
- Instruction set: 78K Family

Products, models, variants
- Variant: 78K0R, 78K0S, 78K0, 78K4, 78K6, 78K3, 78K7, 78K1, 78K2

History
- Predecessors: 87AD Family, 17K Family
- Successor: RL78 Family

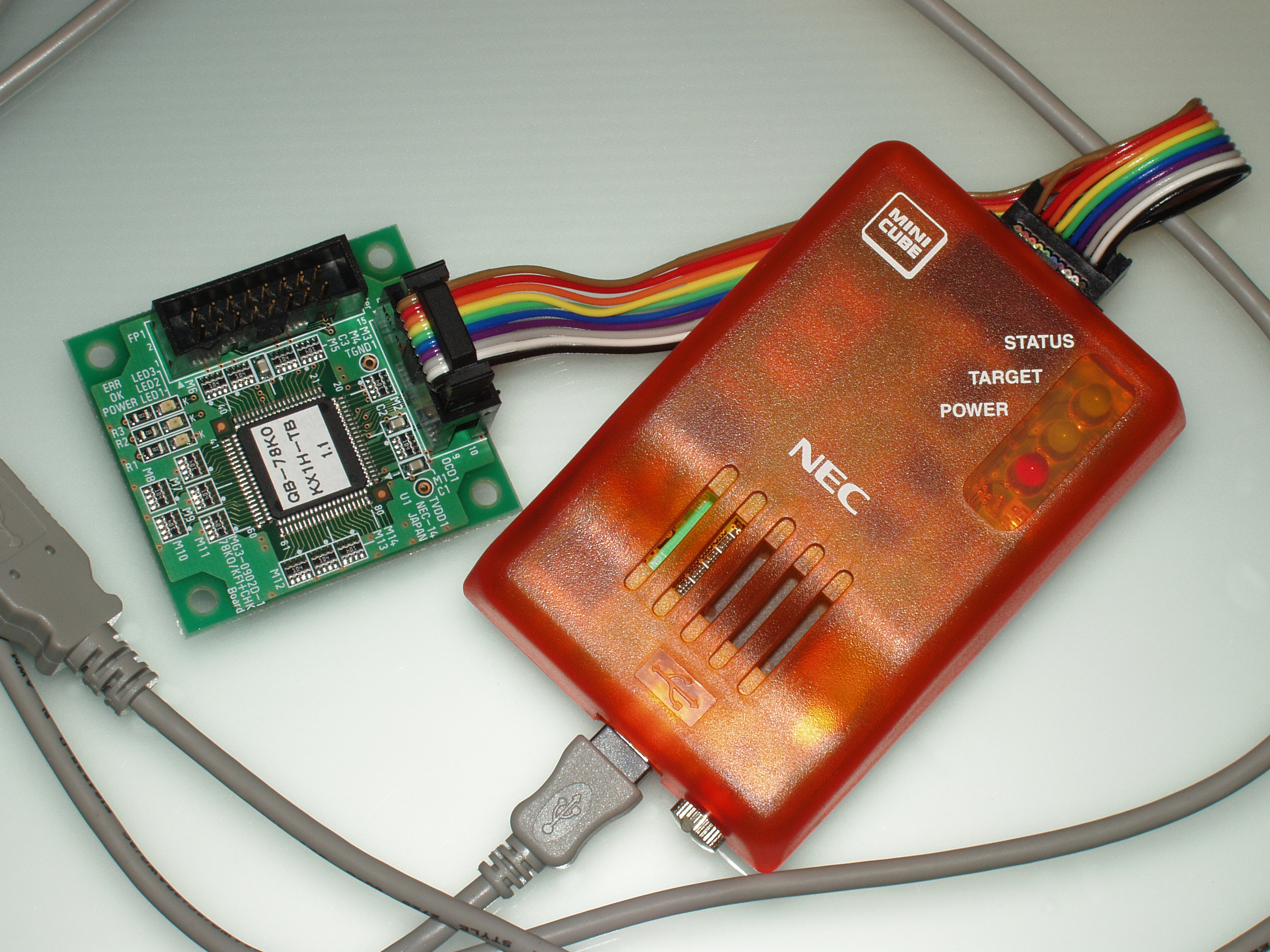
78K0/KX1+ board with in-circuit emulator; MINICUBE

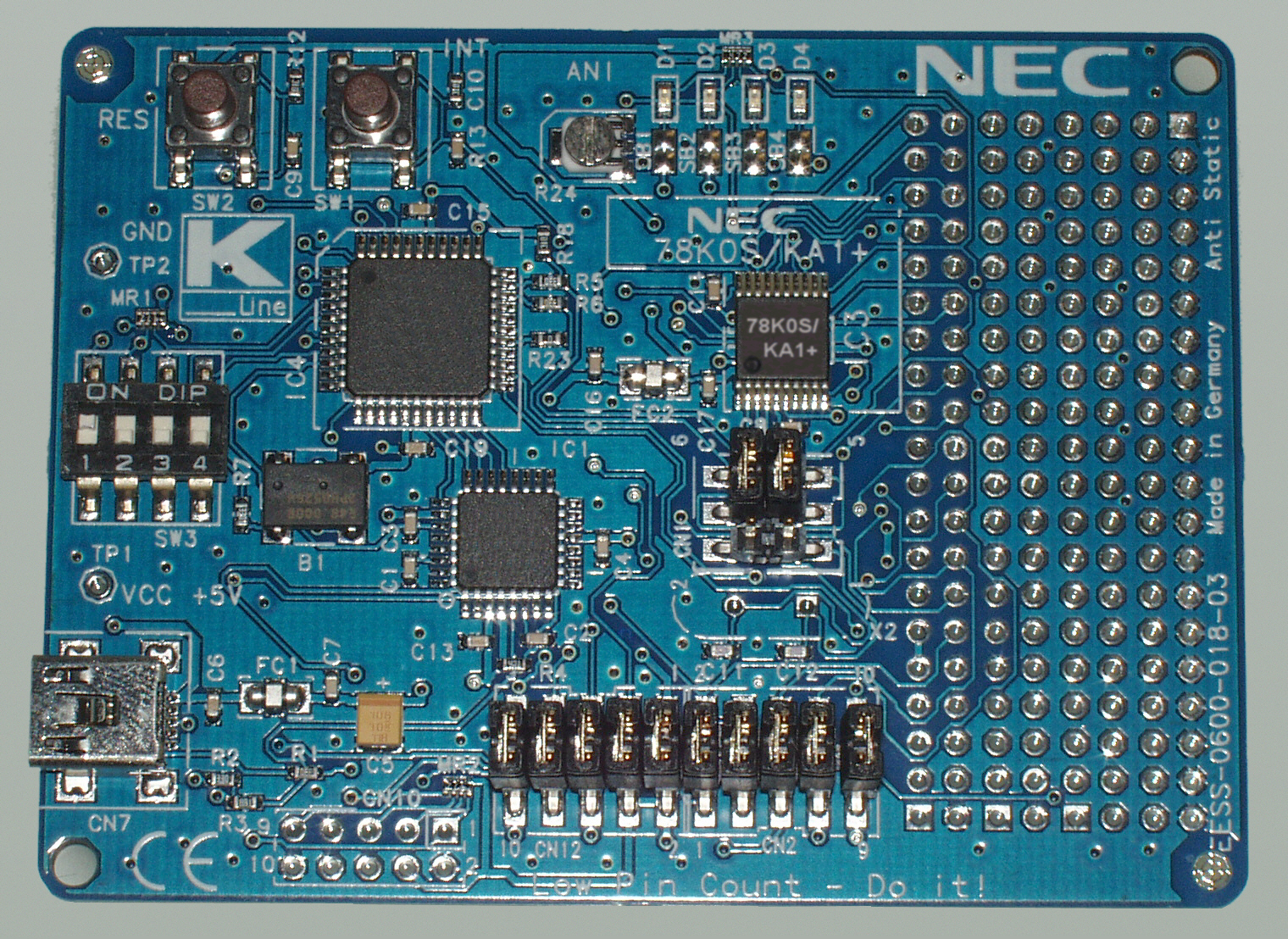
78K0S/KA1+ Do It board

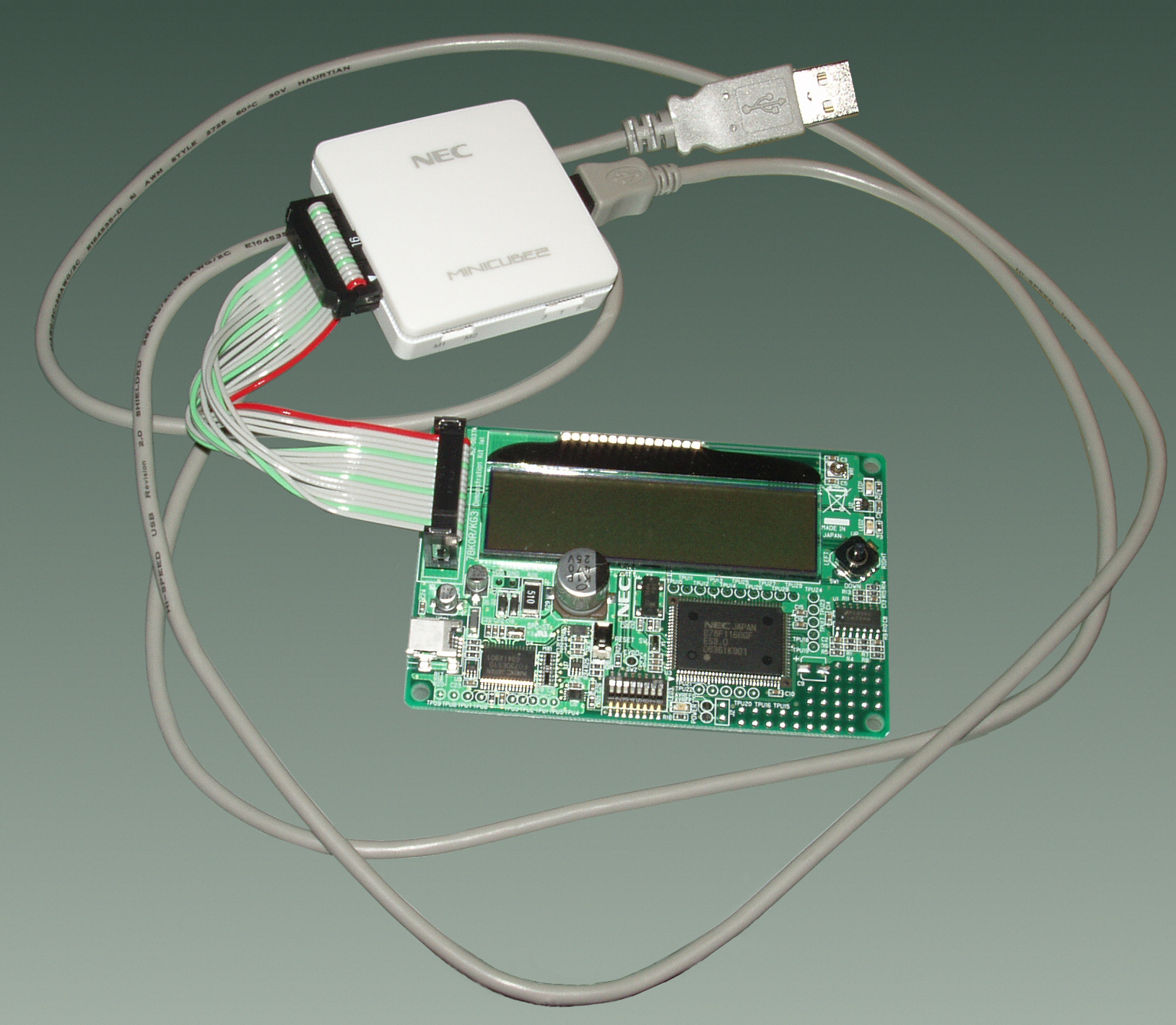
78K0R/KG3 Cool It board with in-circuit emulator; IECUBE ^{(formerly, MINICUBE2)}

78K is the trademark name of 16- and 8-bit microcontroller family manufactured by Renesas Electronics, originally developed by NEC started in 1986. The basis of 78K Family is an accumulator-based register-bank CISC architecture. 78K is a single-chip microcontroller, which usually integrates; program ROM, data RAM, serial interfaces, timers, I/O ports, an A/D converter, an interrupt controller, and a CPU core, on one die.

Its application area is mainly simple mechanical system controls and man-machine interfaces.

Regarding software development tools, C compilers and macro-assemblers are available. As for development tool hardware, full probing-pod type and debug port type in-circuit emulators, and flash ROM programmers are available.

Historically, the family has 11 series with 9 instruction set architectures. As of 2018, 3 instruction set architectures, those are 8-bit 78K0, 8-bit 78K0S, and 16-/8-bit 78K0R, are still promoted for customers' new designs. But in most of cases, migration to RL78 Family, which is a successor of 78K0R and almost binary level compatible with 78K0R, is recommended.

== Variants ==
=== 78K0 Series ===
78K0 Series (also known as 78K/0) is a long-running 8-bit single chip microcontroller, which is the basis of 78K0S and 78K0R Series. It contains 8× 8-bit registers ×4 banks. For 16-bit calculating instructions, it performs ALU operation twice. Each instructions are performed serially without instruction pipelining. It has 16-bit 64K Byte address space. Some variants of 78K0 have affordable and compact type 8-bit R-2R D/A converter, which does not have monotonicity because it is not trimmed for adjustment nor followed by operational amplifier.

In its earlier stage, the Program Memory was one-time PROM (OTP), UV-EPROM, or mask ROM. But with the times, it became flash memory.

=== 78K0S Series ===
78K0S Series (also known as 78K/0S) is a low-end version of 78K0. It has 8× 8-bit registers, but without any banks. In addition, some instructions, such as multiplication and division, are removed from 78K0 instruction set architecture.

=== 78K0R Series ===
78K0R Series is a 16-bit single-chip microcontroller with 3-stage instruction pipelining. Its instruction set is similar to 78K0 and covers 16- and 8-bit operations. It has 20-bit 1M Byte address space. 75 instructions out of 80 are identical with that of RL78 Family; its successor.

=== 178K0 Series ===
178K0 Series (also known as 178K/0) is a successor of NEC's 17K Family 4-bit microcontroller for DTS (Digital Tuning Systems) and remote controls. It integrates 17K family's peripheral functions with the 78K0 8-bit CPU core on a chip.

=== 178K0S Series ===
178K0S Series (also known as 178K/0S) is also a successor of 17K Family with the 78K0S CPU core.

=== 78K4 Series ===
78K4 Series (also known as 78K/4) is a 16-bit single-chip microcontroller with 16 and 8-bit operations. It has 16× 8-bit registers ×4 banks, which can be also used for 8× 16-bit registers ×4 banks. Some of these registers can be also used as 24-bit extension for addressing modes. It has 24-bit 16M Byte address space. It has microcode-based operations named Macro Service with interrupt functions.

=== 78K7 Series ===
78K7 Series (also known as 78K/7) is a 32-bit single-chip microcontroller with 32, 16 and 8 bit operations. It has 8× 32-bit registers ×16 banks, which can be also used for 16× 16-bit registers ×16 banks and 16× 8-bit registers ×16 banks. It has microcode-based operations named Macro Service with interrupt functions. It has 24-bit 16M Byte linear address space. It is used for some Quantum Fireball products, but shortly replaced with V850 Family 32-bit RISC microcontrollers.

=== 78K6 Series ===
78K6 Series (also known as 78K/6) is a 16-bit single-chip microcontroller. Its life-time was short, and less variants.

=== 78K1 Series ===
78K1 Series (also known as 78K/1) is an 8-bit single-chip microcontroller. It has 8× 8-bit registers ×4 banks. 78K1 series is targeted for servo controls of videocassette recorders. μPD78148 sub-series integrates 2 operational amplifiers.

=== 78K3 Series ===
78K3 Series (also known as 78K/3) is a 16-bit single-chip microcontroller with 16 and 8 bit operations. It has 16× 8-bit ×8 banks, which can be also used for 8× 16-bit registers ×8 banks. Its address space is 16-bit 64K Byte. It is developed as high-end series of 78K Family. It has microcode-based operations named Macro Service with interrupt functions.

This series is used for hard disk drives, especially Quantum Fireball Series. μPD78364 sub-series is used for inverter compressor controls. It is also used for traction control systems of some cars.

=== 78K2 Series ===
78K2 Series (also known as 78K/2) is an 8-bit single-chip microcontroller. It has 8× 8-bit registers ×4 banks. It is developed as general purpose series of 78K Family.

== Predecessors ==
=== 87AD Family ===
87AD Family is an 8-bit single-chip microcontroller. It has 8× 8-bit registers ×4 banks. Its instruction set architecture became the basis of 78K.

=== 17K Family ===
17K Family is a 4-bit single-chip microcontroller, especially dedicated for DTS (Digital Tuning Systems) and remote controls. It has 2 plane of 128× 4-bit register files, and sophisticated fully orthogonal instruction set. This instruction set is completely different from that of 78K Family.

== Table list of 78K Family ==
Series	ALU	Registers	Instructions	Pipeline	Remark	Documents
RL78-S3	16-bit	8× 8-bit ×4 banks	81 (75+6)	3-stage	Successor of 78K0R	
RL78-S2	16-bit	8× 8-bit ×4 banks	75	3-stage	Successor of 78K0R	
RL78-S1	8-bit	8× 8-bit (no bank)	74 (75-1)	3-stage	Successor of 78K0R	
78K0R	16-bit	8× 8-bit ×4 banks	80 (75+5)	3-stage	Extended 78K/0	
78K0S	8-bit	8× 8-bit (no bank)	47	none	Simplified 78K/0	
78K0	8-bit	8× 8-bit ×4 banks	48	none	Basic 78K/0 core	
178K0S	8-bit	8× 8-bit	47	none	78K/0S for DTS;^{Digital Tuning System}	
178K0	8-bit	8× 8-bit ×4 banks	48	none	78K/0 for DTS	
78K4	16-bit	16× 8-bit ×4 banks	113	none	Macro service available	
78K7	32-bit	16× 16-bit ×16 banks		none	Macro service available	
78K6	16-bit				Macro service available	
78K1	8-bit	8× 8-bit ×4 banks	64	none	For VCR servo controls	
78K3	16-bit	16× 8-bit ×8 banks	113–115	none	Macro service available	
78K2	8-bit	8× 8-bit ×4 banks	65	none	General purpose	
87AD	8-bit	8× 8-bit ×2 banks	CMOS: 159; NMOS: 158	none	Predecessor of 78K	
(17K)	4-bit	128× 4-bit ×2 banks	47	none	Predecessor of 178K	

== See also ==
- RL78
- NEC V20
- V850
- Renesas 740
- IEBus
