= IAR Systems =

Swedish computer software company

- Native name: Ingenjörsfirma Anders Rundgren
- Romanized name: Anders Rundgren Engineering Company
- Type: Division
- Industry: Programming tools, software engineering
- Founded: 1983; 43 years ago in Uppsala, Sweden
- Founder: Anders Rundgren
- Headquarters: Uppsala, Sweden
- Number of locations: 13 offices (2024)
- Area served: Worldwide
- Products: IAR Embedded Workbench; IAR Build Tools; IAR Visual State; IAR I-jet/I-jet Trace
- Number of employees: 200
- Website: www.iar.com

IAR Systems Group AB has been fully owned by Qt Group since October 2025, operating as an independent business unit. It is a Swedish computer software company that offers development tools for embedded systems. IAR was founded in 1983. IAR is an abbreviation of Ingenjörsfirma Anders Rundgren, which means Anders Rundgren Engineering Company.

IAR develops C and C++ language compilers, debuggers, and other tools for developing and debugging firmware for 8-, 16-, 32-, and 64-bit processors. The firm began in the 8-bit market, later moved into the expanding 32-bit market and, in more recent years, added 64-bit support to its Arm (2021) and RISC-V (2022) toolchains.

IAR is headquartered in Uppsala, Sweden, and has more than 200 employees globally. The company operates subsidiaries in Germany, France, India, Japan, South Korea, China, United States, Taiwan, and United Kingdom and reaches the rest of the world through distributors.

== Products ==
Key products include:

  - IAR Embedded Workbench – an integrated development environment featuring a highly optimized C/C++ compiler, the C-SPY debugger, and the static and runtime analysis tools C-STAT and C-RUN. It is a cross-platform IDE running natively on Linux and Windows, with support for CMake-based builds.
  - IAR Build Tools – designed for automated build and test processes in CI/CD environments, available for both Windows and Linux.
  - IAR Visual State – a graphical design tool for state-based software architecture with code generation in C, C++C++, C#, or Java.
  - Functional Safety Extensions – including TÜV-certified toolchains for standards like ISO 26262, IEC 61508, and IEC 62304. The platform supports over 20 architectures, including ARM, RISC-V, MSP430, RL78, AVR.

=== IAR Embedded Workbench ===
The toolchain IAR Embedded Workbench, which supports more than 30 different processor families, is a complete integrated development environment (IDE) with compiler, analysis tools, debugger and functional safety. The development tools support these targets: 78K, 8051, ARM, AVR, AVR32, CR16C, Coldfire, H8, HCS12, M16C, M32C, MSP430, Maxim MAXQ, RISC-V RV32, R32C, R8C, RH850, RL78, RX, S08, SAM8, STM8, SuperH, V850. Supported ARM core families are: ARM7, ARM9, ARM10, ARM11, Cortex: M0, M0+, M1, M3, M4, M7, M23, M33; R4, R5, R7; A5, A7, A8, A9, A15, A17. RISC-V tools support the RV32I, RV32E and RV64I base integer instruction sets and a wide range of standard and non-standard extensions.

IAR Embedded Workbench C++ is dialectal and contains some features not part of standard C++.

ISO/ANSI C compliance; as of March 2017:

- ANSI X3.159-1989 (known as C89).
- ISO/IEC 9899:1990 (known as C89 or C90) including all technical corrigenda and addenda.
- ISO/IEC 9899:1999 (known as C99) including up to technical corrigendum No3.
- ISO/IEC 9899:2011 (known as C11). (first available in ARM v8.10 tools)
- ISO/IEC 9899:2018 (known as C17). (first available in ARM v8.40 tools)

ISO/ANSI C++ compliance; as of March 2017:

- ISO/IEC 14882:2003 (known as C++03).
- ISO/IEC 14882:2014 (known as C++14). (first available in ARM v8.10 tools)
- ISO/IEC 14882:2017 (known as C++17). (first available in ARM v8.30 tools)

Embedded C++ compliance; as of February 2015:

- C++ as defined by ISO/IEC 14882:2003.
- Embedded C++ (EC++) as defined by Embedded C++ Technical Committee Draft, Version WP-AM-0003, 13 October 1999.
- Extended Embedded C++, defined by IAR Systems.

MISRA C rule checking conformance:

- MISRA C:2004
- MISRA C:2012 Amendment 3
- MISRA C++:2008
