= Lauterbach (company) =

German software company

Coordinates: 48.022921°N 11.715559°E

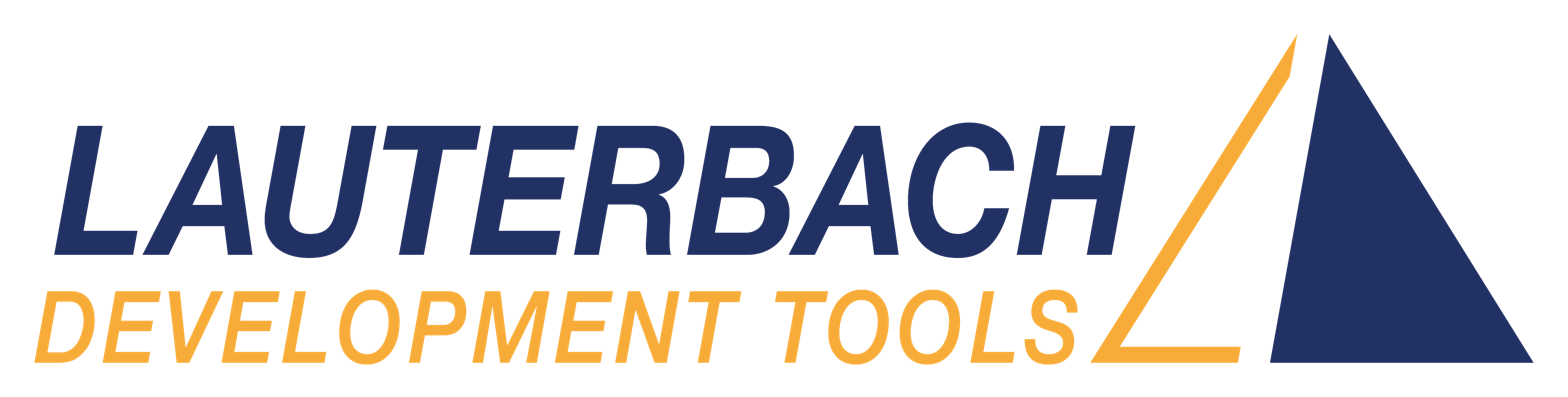
- Type: Private limited Company (GmbH)
- Industry: Embedded systems
- Founded: 1979; 47 years ago
- Founder: Lothar Lauterbach
- Headquarters: Höhenkirchen-Siegertsbrunn, Germany
- Area served: Worldwide
- Key people: Lothar Lauterbach, Stephan Lauterbach, Norbert Weiss, Dr. Thomas Ullmann
- Products: Debugger, JTAG debugger, Realtime trace, Emulators, Instruction set simulators
- Website: lauterbach.com

Lauterbach GmbH (German pronunciation: [ˈlaʊtɐbax]) is a German firm specializing in Debuggers, Trace Modules and logic analyzers used for debugging, profiling and analyzing embedded systems. The company was founded in 1979 by Lothar Lauterbach. In 2009 the firm was renamed from Lauterbach Datentechnik GmbH to Lauterbach GmbH.

Lauterbach has local subsidiaries in United Kingdom, United States, Japan, France, Italy, China and Tunisia.

Lauterbach has participated in the following international committees and associated working groups over the past years: AUTOSAR, RISC-V, Nexus, ASAM, MIPI Debug Working Group, SPRINT Forum and Power.org.

In 2017, Lauterbach was selected as a development partner by SiFive to develop the first comprehensive RISC-V debugging toolset, adding support for the RISC-V debug specification to TRACE32.

On 10th November 2026, Siemens Digital Industries Software announced their intention to purchase Lauterbach.
