= Quantum Fireball =

3.5-inch hard disk drive made by Quantum Corporation

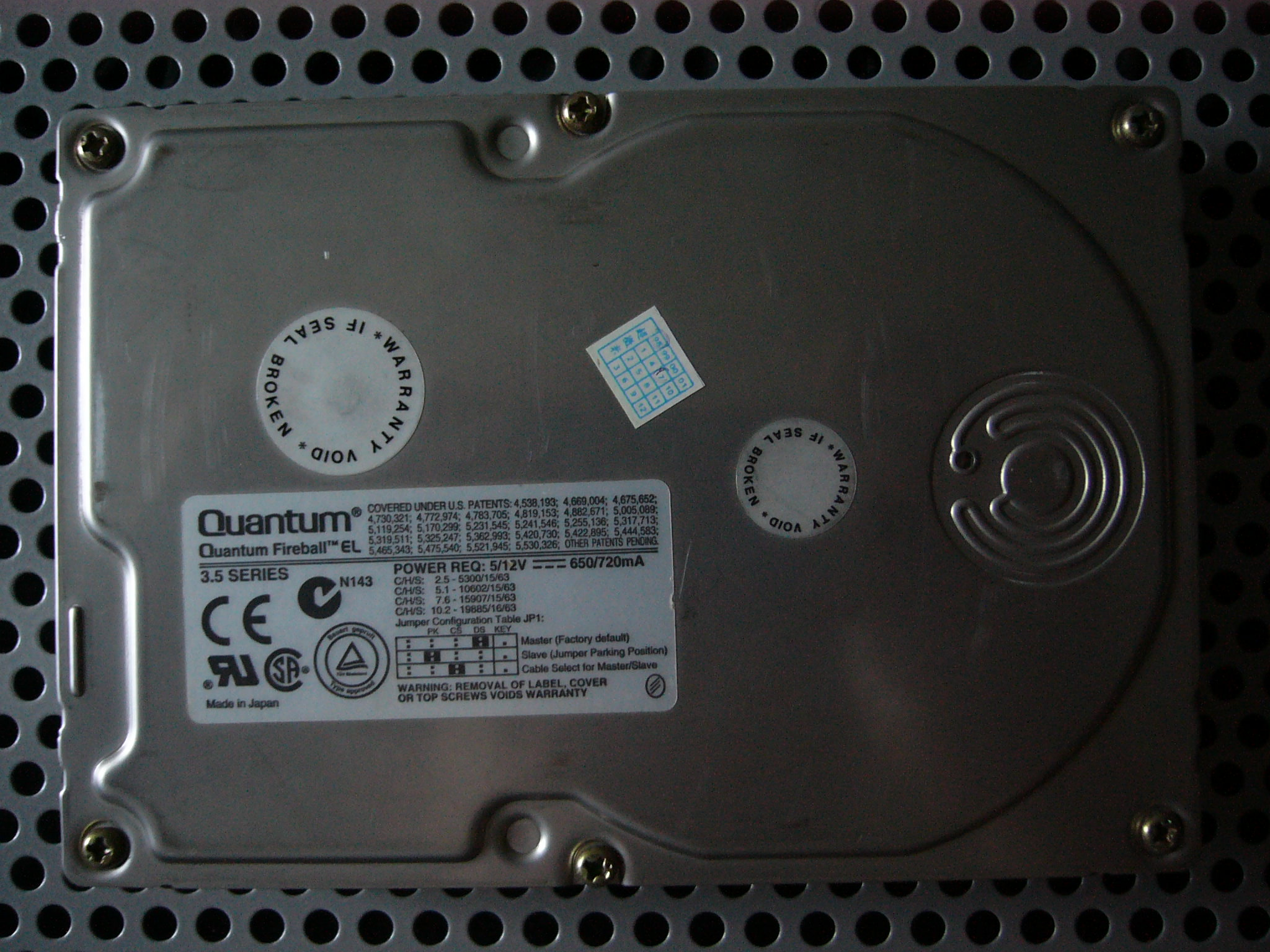
- A Quantum Fireball EL 5.1 GB hard drive
- Connects to: Computer via one of: SCSI (original, TM, ST, SE); IDE (all models)
- Design firm: Quantum Corporation
- Introduced: 1995
- Discontinued: 2001

The Quantum Fireball was a brand of 3.5-inch hard disk drives made by Quantum Corporation from 1995 to 2001. The first models in the series were 5400 RPM and came in 0.54 and 1.08 GB capacities, while the Quantum Fireball Plus was known for being Quantum's first 7200 RPM Integrated Drive Electronics (IDE) hard drive. There were sixteen different models of the Quantum Fireball, with the last being the LCT 20.

== Models ==
=== Fireball (original) ===
This generation of Quantum Fireball drives was launched in mid-1995 and offered 0.54 and 1.08 GB capacities. In 1996, capacities were increased to 0.64 and 1.28 GB. They had one or two platters, an IDE or SCSI interface and a 5400 RPM spindle speed.

=== Fireball TM ===
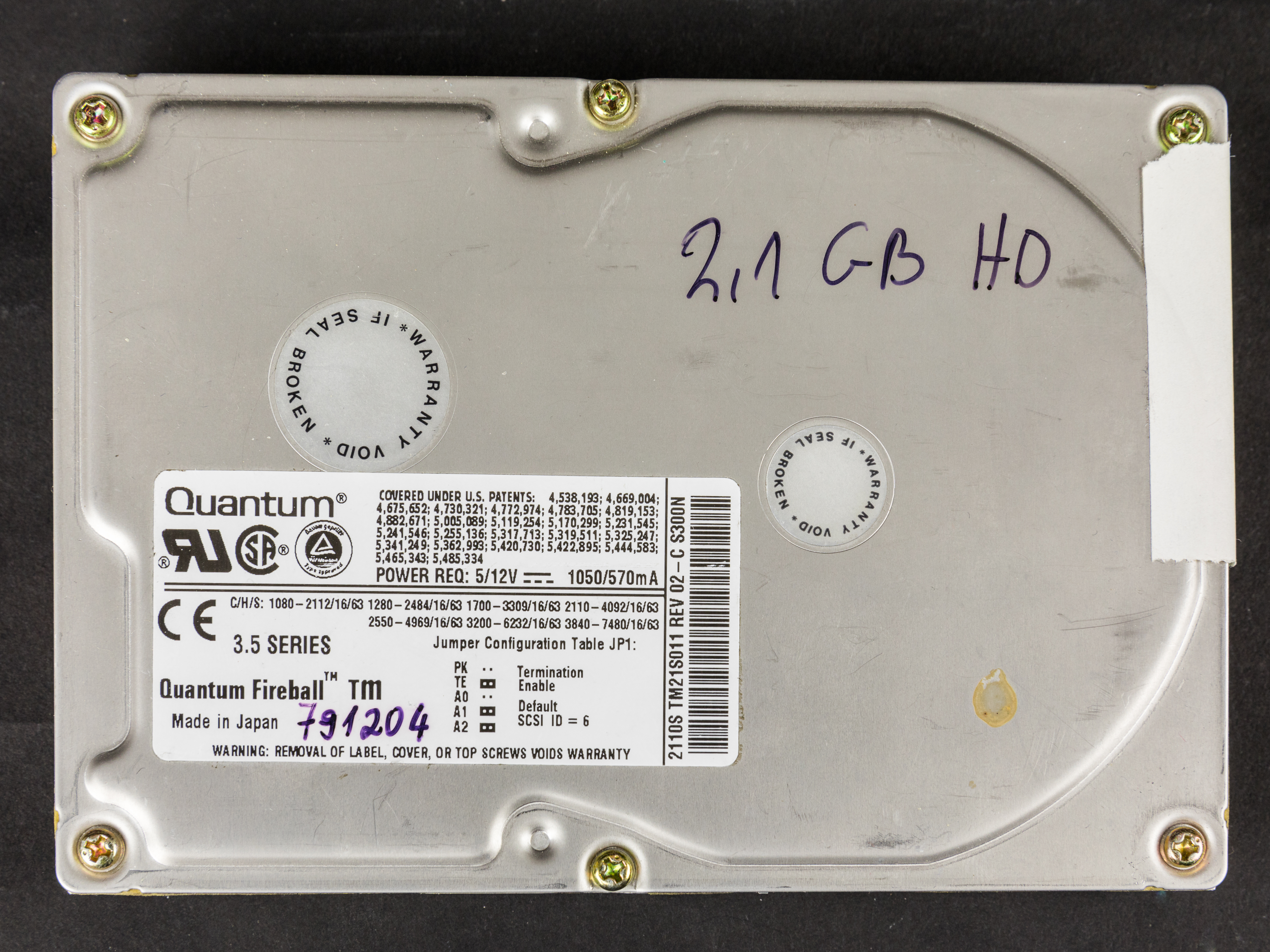
Quantum Fireball TM, 2.1 GB

Released in 1997, this series of drives was positioned as a low-end model. With a 4500 RPM spindle speed and sporting a new design, these drives were originally available in 1.08 and 2.1 GB capacities with up to two platters; later models were available in capacities of up to 3.8 GB with three platters.

=== Fireball ST ===
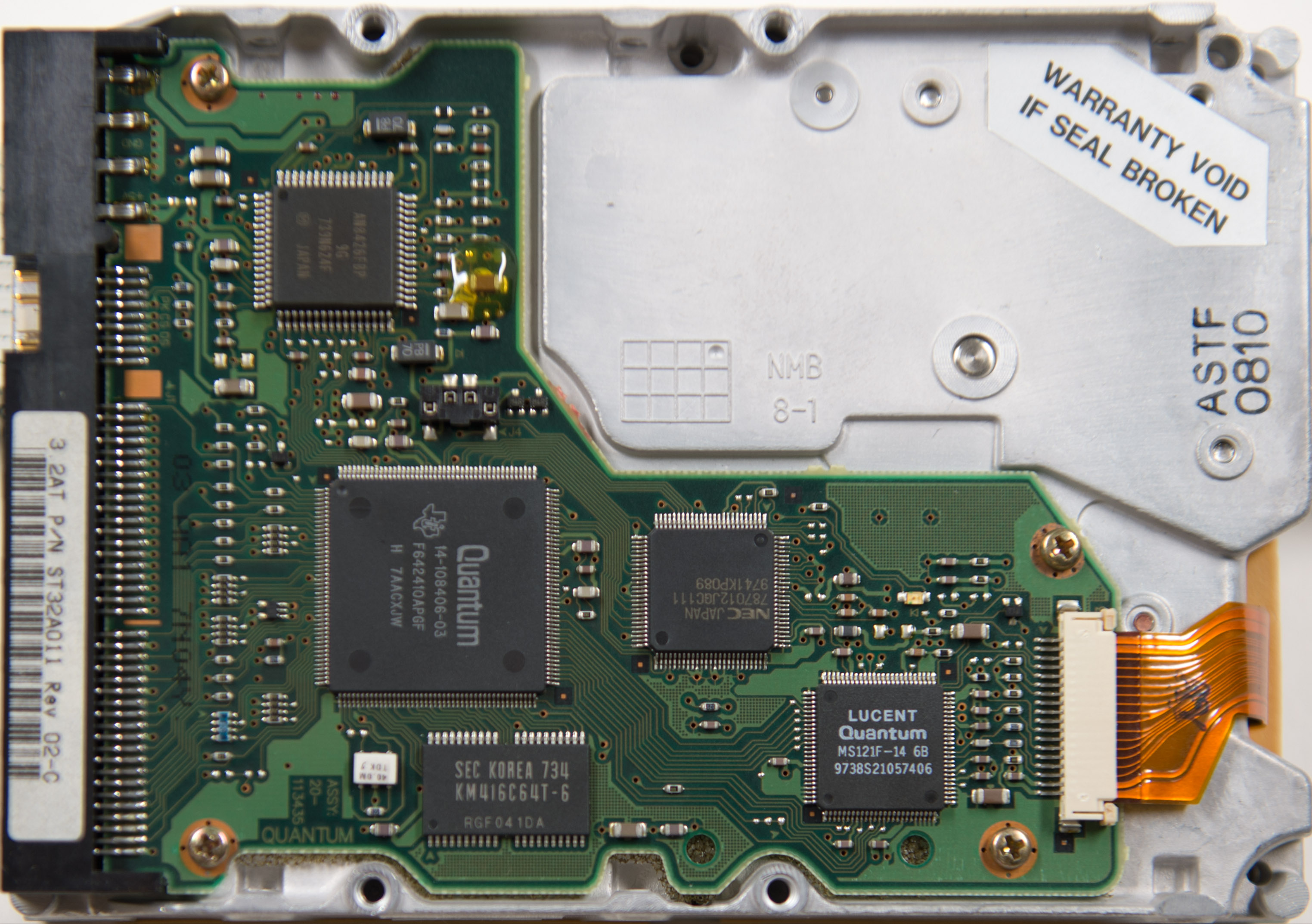
Quantum Fireball ST 3.2 GB,
bottom view

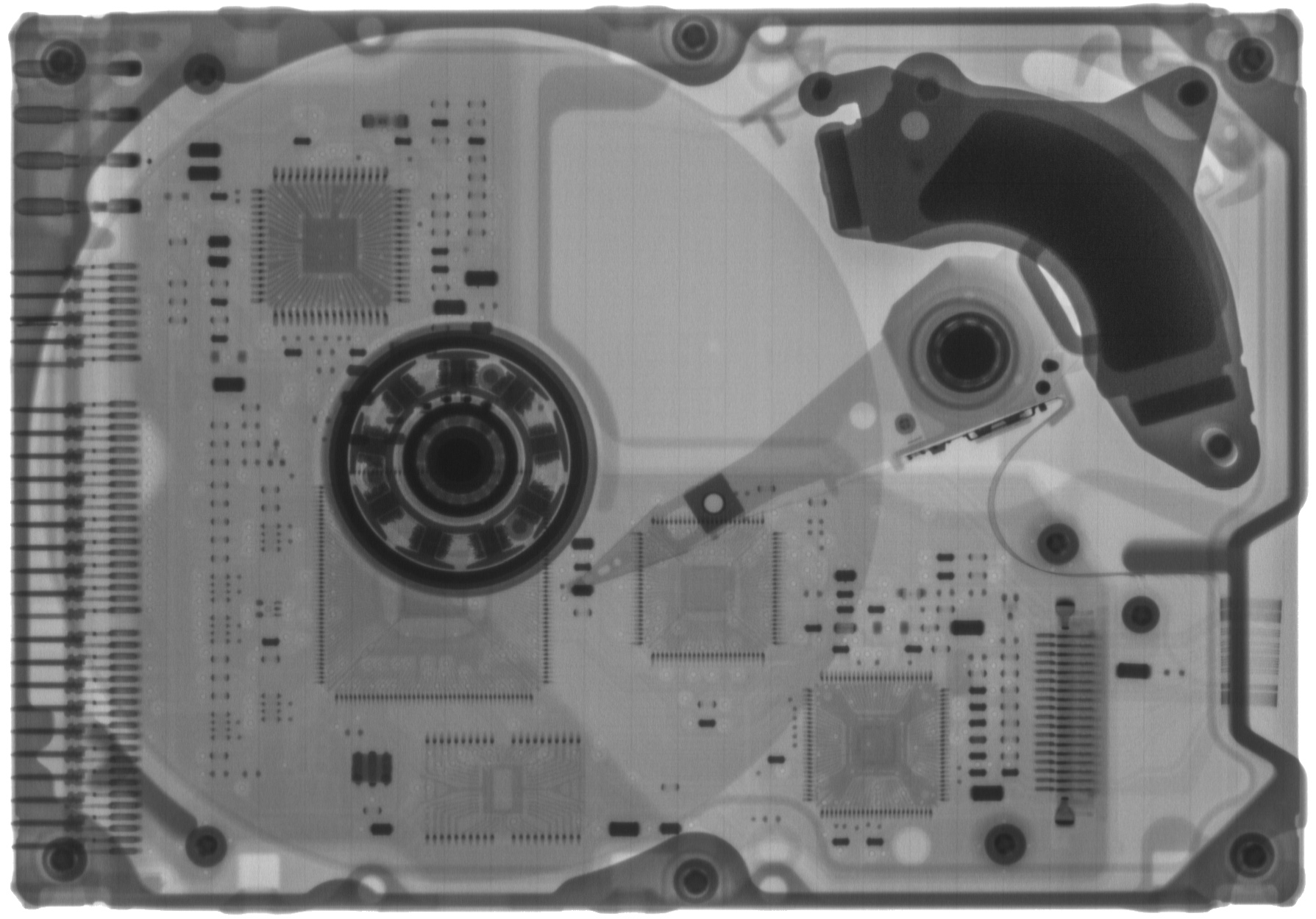
Quantum Fireball ST 3.2 GB,
x-ray view

In 1997, Quantum released the Fireball ST. Notable for its high performance as well as being the first hard drive with an ATA-4 interface (SCSI models were also available), this series of hard drives were available in 1.6, 2.1, 3.2, 4.3, 5.1 and 6.4 GB capacities, with one, two or four platters, and a 5400 RPM spindle speed.

=== Fireball SE ===
1998 saw the release of the Fireball SE. This series improved upon the Fireball ST by having higher platter capacities and data transfer rates, while having the same cache size, spindle speed and drive interface as the Fireball ST. These drives were available in ATA-4 and SCSI interfaces with capacities up to 8.4 GB with four platters. These were Quantum's last Fireball drives available with a SCSI interface.

=== Fireball EL ===
In 1998, the Fireball EL was the first Fireball drive with an ATA-5 interface. This model had the spiral-shaped breather hole on the top cover. It quadrupled the Fireball SE's cache to 512 KB, while still having a 5400 RPM spindle speed. These drives were available in 2.5, 4.3, 5.1, 7.6 and 10.3 GB capacities with up to four platters.

=== Fireball EX ===
By the end of 1998, Quantum launched the Fireball EX. This series increased the platter capacities of the Fireball EL by about 25%; capacities of 3.2, 5.1, 6.4, 10.2 and 12.7 GB with up to four platters were available. Aside from increased capacities, the specifications were the same as the Fireball EL.

=== Fireball CR ===
Launched in 1999, the Fireball CR series increased the platter capacities of the Fireball EL by about 33%; capacities of 4.3, 6.4, 8.4 and 12.7 GB with up to three platters were available. The cache, spindle speed and interface were the same as the Fireball EX.

=== Fireball CX ===
Launched in late 1999, the Fireball CX was Quantum's first hard drive with GMR heads. While having the same interface and spindle speed as the Fireball CR, the capacities available were 6.4, 8.4, 10.2, 13 and 20.4 GB with up to three platters. (Shipped with the iMac G3 in late 1999)

=== Fireball Plus models ===
==== Fireball Plus KA ====
The Fireball Plus KA, launched in 1999, was known for being Quantum's first 7200 RPM IDE hard drive, while still having 512 KB of cache and an ATA-5 interface. It was available in 6.1, 9.4, 13.2 and 18.2 GB capacities with up to four platters.

==== Fireball Plus KX ====
Launched in 1999, this series increased the capacities of the KA to 6.4, 10.2, 13.6, 20.5 and 27.3 GB while still having up to four platters. It had the same cache, interface and spindle speed as the KA.

==== Fireball Plus LM ====
Launched in early 2000, this series increased the cache size to 2 MB while still having the ATA-5 interface. It was available in 10, 15, 20 and 30 GB capacities with up to three platters.

==== Fireball Plus AS ====
Launched later in 2000, this was Quantum's first hard drive to optionally feature fluid dynamic bearings and an ATA-6 interface. It had a 2 MB cache and was available in 10.2, 20, 30, 40 and 60 GB capacities with up to three platters.

=== Fireball LCT models ===
Quantum launched the LCT line in 1999. LCT stands for "low-cost technology."

==== LCT 8 ====
Launched in late 1999, it had a 512 KB cache, 5400 RPM spindle speed, and an ATA-5 interface. It was available in 4.3, 8.4, 13, 17.3 and 26 GB capacities with up to three platters.

==== LCT 10 ====
Launched in early 2000, it had the same spindle speed, cache and interface as the LCT 8. Capacities available were 5.1, 10.2, 15, 20.4 and 30 GB with up to three platters. Some LCT 10 drives had a reliability issue: the circuit board had an integrated circuit that burned out, making the drive unusable.

==== LCT 15 ====
In mid-2000, Quantum released the LCT 15. It lowered the spindle speed to 4400 RPM, but still had 512 KB of cache and an ATA-5 interface. Capacities available were 7.5, 15, 20.4 and 30 GB with up to two platters.

==== LCT 20 ====
Launched later in 2000, this was the last Fireball LCT series. It had 128 KB of cache, an ATA-6 interface and a 4500 RPM spindle speed. Capacities available were 10, 20, 30 and 40 GB with up to two platters.

=== Maxtor: D540X and D740X ===
Quantum's last hard drive designs eventually got rebranded as Maxtor after the merger.

==== D540X ====
The Maxtor D540X was available in 20.4GB, 40GB, 60GB and 80GB capacities with disk densities of 40GB/platter, using 2 platters for a maximum of 80GB and with 2MB cache

==== D740X ====
These drives originally were intended to be branded as the Fireball Plus VQ. The D740X was available in 20.4, 40, 60 and 80GB capacities with a maximum of 2 platters 40GB platters and 2MB cache.
