= Motorola 6800 family =

Family of microprocessors

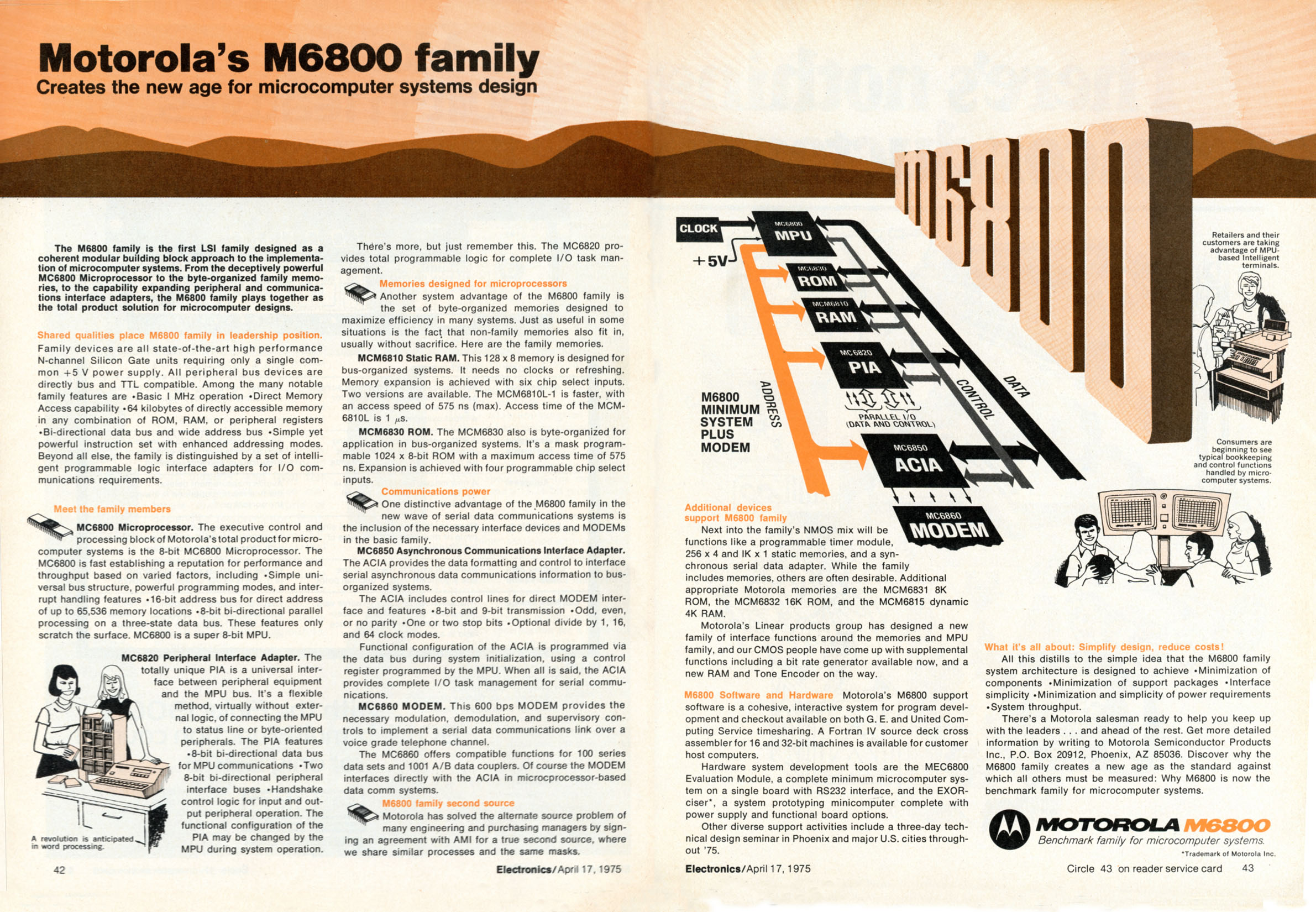
An early advertisement for the Motorola's M6800 family microcomputer system

The M6800 Microcomputer System, later dubbed the Motorola 6800 family, M6800 family, or 68xx, was a series of 8-bit microprocessors from Motorola that began with the 6800 CPU. The 6800 initially competed against Intel's 8-bit family of chips such as the 8080, but new entries like the MOS 6502 and Zilog Z80 drove the original 6800 from widespread use.

The original 6800 was typical of microprocessors of the era, requiring the designer to add RAM and ROM and other support chips to build a complete system. Over the 6800's lifetime, improvements in the design allowed a number of these other chips to be built-in to the CPU to turn them into single-chip systems, better known today as microcontrollers. The limitations in available space and cost of production produced a series of similar designs that added or removed various features to allow them to fit in a single package.

Although the 6800 itself did not see as widespread use as some contemporary designs, it had a wide influence on the market as a whole. The desire to simplify the 6800 to reduce its cost led to the 6502, which became one of the most popular designs of the era. The 6800 was also "cloned" by Hitachi as the 6301. Both were re-implemented in CMOS, which had "C" in the name to distinguish them. Motorola upgraded the 6800 into the Motorola 6809, which was backward compatible while also adding a variety of new features. This was also cloned by Hitachi, who added many new features of their own to produce the Hitachi 6309.

Greatly improved versions of the later family members continued to be offered by Motorola into the 1990s, when the chip division was spun out as Freescale Semiconductor, which in turn was purchased by NXP in 2015. NXP continues to offer the design to this day, used as an embedded controller in larger chip systems.

== Family members ==
- 6800, the original design
- 6801, adds 128 bytes of static RAM and 2048 bytes of mask-programmable ROM. 64 bytes of the RAM could be retained while the processor was shut down, allowing it to be put into a low-power state and wake rapidly. The 6801 also improved cycle counts of a number of instructions, added an 8x8 bit unsigned multiplier, and a 16-bit timer. As the RAM and ROM no longer had to be connected externally, the pins formerly used by the address bus and data bus could also be put into a separate "mode" where they acted as three 8-bit parallel ports and one 5-bit parallel port. The timer could also be used as a controller for a serial port, which re-used some of the lines in the 5-bit port.
  - 68701, version of the 6801 with EPROM instead of ROM, allowing the developer to write their programs during development.
- 6802, version of the 6800 with 128 bytes of on-board RAM and an internal clock source. Similar to the 6801, 32 bytes of the internal RAM could be retained in standby.
  - 6802NS, version of the 6802 without the "standby RAM" feature.
- 6803, version of the 6801 without the internal ROM or EPROM, which had to be provided externally. This was essentially a 6801 that is locked in "mode 3".
- 6805 and 146805, a product-improvement design that combined the features of previous designs into a single design that could then be customized for various uses. There were a dozen versions of the first run, combining different features in 28- or 40-pin packages. There were also three versions fabricated in CMOS, which had the "14" prepended to the name.
- 6808, 6802 that had failed production test of its internal RAM. Its RAM enable pin was designated GND.
- Motorola 6809, a pure-CPU that adds many new features, so many that it is generally considered to be a separate design.
- Hitachi 6301, a clone of the 6801 used in the Psion Organiser I
- Hitachi HD6303 used in the Psion Organiser II, Yamaha's KX88 MIDI keyboard and Yamaha DX7 synthesizer and Roland TR-707 drum machine
- Hitachi 6309, Hitachi's version of the 6809, which added many new features.
- Motorola 68HC05
- Freescale 68HC08
- Freescale 68HC11
- Freescale 68HC12 (16-bit)
- Motorola 68HC16 (16-bit)

== See also ==
- Instruction set
