= Motorola 68HC11 =

8-bit microcontroller family

Motorola MC68HC11
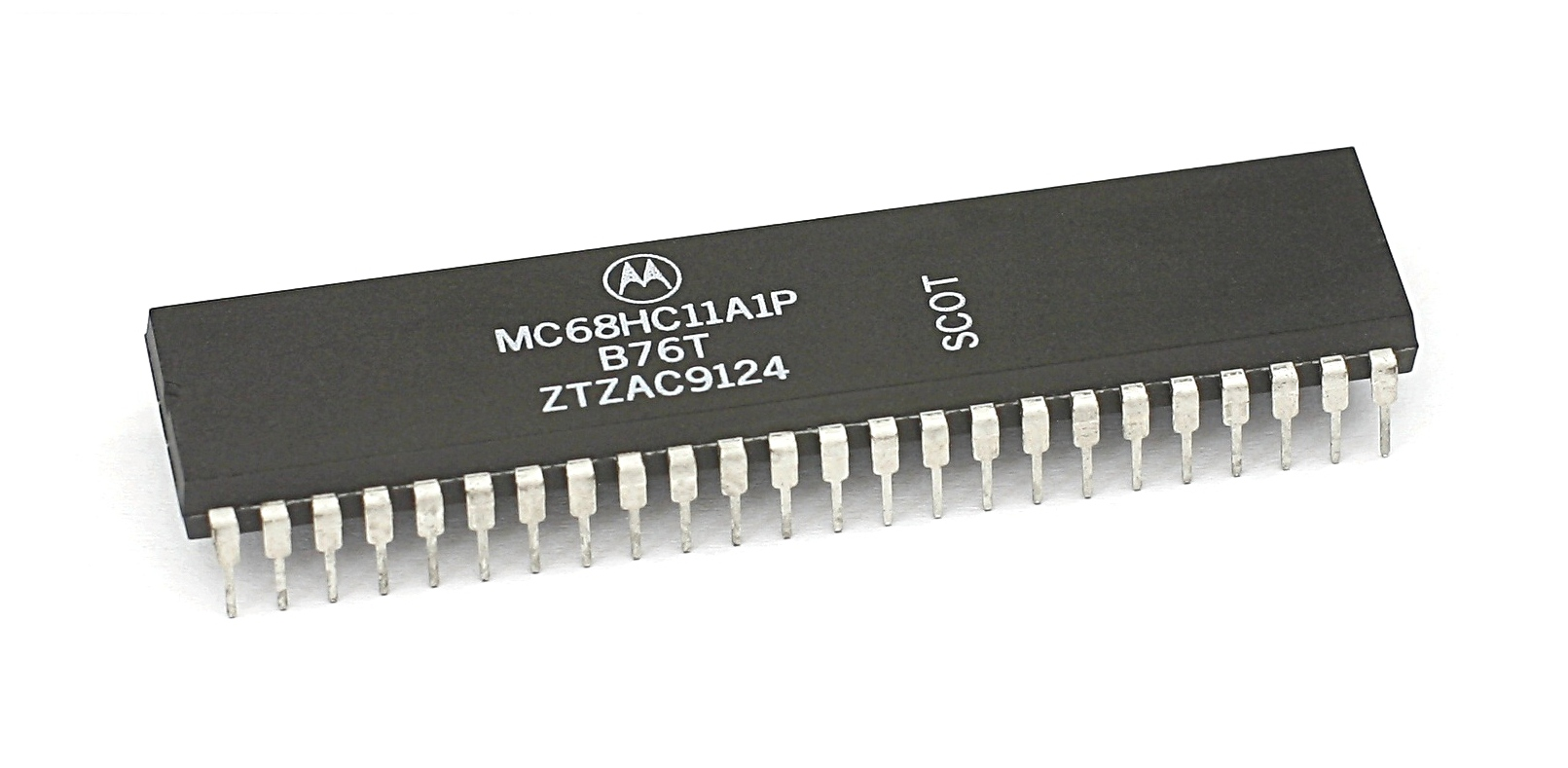
- Motorola MC68HC11 in a 48-pin DIP package

General information
- Launched: 1984; 42 years ago
- Common manufacturer: Motorola, Freescale, NXP

Performance
- Data width: 8
- Address width: 16

Physical specifications
- Package: 48-pin DIP, 52-pin PLCC

Architecture and classification
- Application: Embedded
- Instruction set: 68HC11

History
- Predecessor: 6801
- Successors: Freescale 68HC16, Freescale 68HC12

The 68HC11 (also abbreviated as 6811 or HC11) is an 8-bit microcontroller family introduced by Motorola Semiconductor in 1984 (later from Freescale then NXP). It descended from the Motorola 6800 microprocessor by way of the 6801. The 68HC11 devices are more powerful and more expensive than the 68HC08 microcontrollers and are used in automotive applications, barcode readers, hotel card key writers, amateur robotics, and various other embedded systems. The MC68HC11A8 was the first microcontroller to include CMOS EEPROM.

== Architecture ==
- Motorola 68HC11 registers
^{1}_{5}	^{1}_{4}	^{1}_{3}	^{1}_{2}	^{1}_{1}	^{1}_{0}	^{0}_{9}	^{0}_{8}	^{0}_{7}	^{0}_{6}	^{0}_{5}	^{0}_{4}	^{0}_{3}	^{0}_{2}	^{0}_{1}	^{0}_{0}	(bit position)
Main registers
A								B								D register pair
Index registers
IX																X index register
IY																Y index register
SP																Stack Pointer
Program counter
PC																Program Counter
Status register
								1	1	H	I	N	Z	V	C	Flags

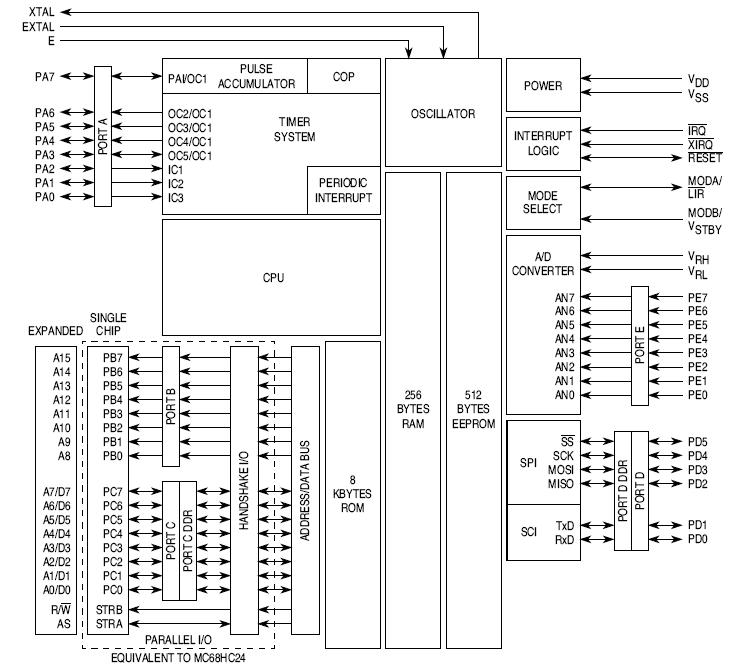
68HC11 block diagram

Internally, the HC11 instruction set is backward compatible with the 6800 and features the addition of a Y index register. (Note: Instructions using the Y register have a byte opcode prefix of 0x18.) It has two eight-bit accumulators, A and B, two sixteen-bit index registers, X and Y, a condition code register, a 16-bit stack pointer, and a program counter. In addition, there is an 8 x 8-bit multiply (A × B), with a full 16-bit result, and fractional or integer 16-bit by 16-bit divide instructions. A range of 16-bit instructions treats the A and B registers as a combined 16-bit D register for comparison (X and Y registers may also be compared to 16-bit memory operands), addition, subtraction and shift operations, or can add the B accumulator to the X or Y index registers. Bit test operations have also been added, performing a logical and function between operands, setting the correct condition codes, but not modifying the operands.

Different versions of the HC11 have different numbers of external ports, labeled alphabetically. The most common version has five ports, A, B, C, D, and E, but some have as few as 3 ports (version D3). Each port is eight bits wide except for D, which is six bits (in some variations of the chip, D also has eight bits). It can be operated with an internal program and RAM (1 to 768 bytes) or an external memory of up to 64 kilobytes. With external memory, B and C are used as address and data bus. In this mode, port C is multiplexed to carry both the lower byte of the address and data.

== Implementations ==
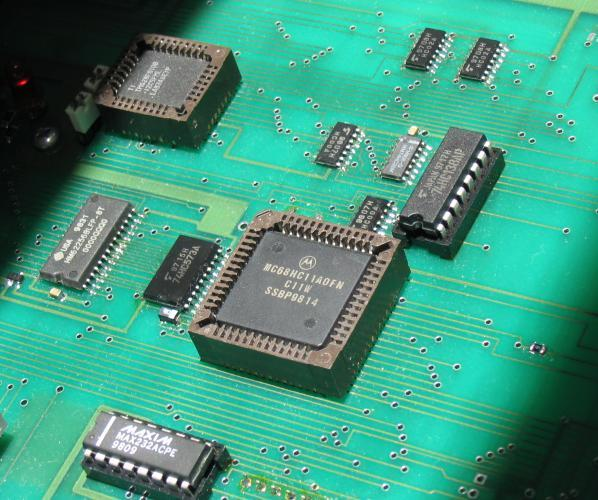
52-pin plastic leaded chip carrier (PLCC)

In the early 1990s, Motorola produced an evaluation board kit for the 68HC11 with several UARTs, RAM, and an EPROM. The cost of the evaluation kit was $68.11.

The standard monitor for the HC11 family is called BUFFALO, "Bit User Fast Friendly Aid to Logical Operation". It can be stored in on-chip ROM, EPROM, or external memory (also typically EPROM). BUFFALO is available for most 68HC11 family derivatives as it generally only depends upon having access to a single UART (SCI, or Serial Communications Interface, in Motorola parlance). BUFFALO can also run on devices that do not have internal non-volatile memory, such as the 68HC11A0, A1, E0, E1, and F1 derivatives.

== Other versions ==
The Freescale 68HC16 microcontroller family is intended as a 16-bit mostly software-compatible upgrade of the 68HC11.

The Freescale 68HC12 microcontroller family is an enhanced 16-bit version of the 68HC11.

The Handy Board robotics controller by Fred Martin is based on the 68HC11.

A MC68HC24 port replacement unit is available for the 68HC11D, which lacks ports B and C. When placed on the external address bus, it replicates the original functions of B and C. This chip was also used in the evaluation board for in-circuit emulation. Port A has input capture, output compare, pulse accumulator, and other timer functions; port D has serial I/O, and port E has an analog-to-digital converter (ADC).
