= PIC16x84 =

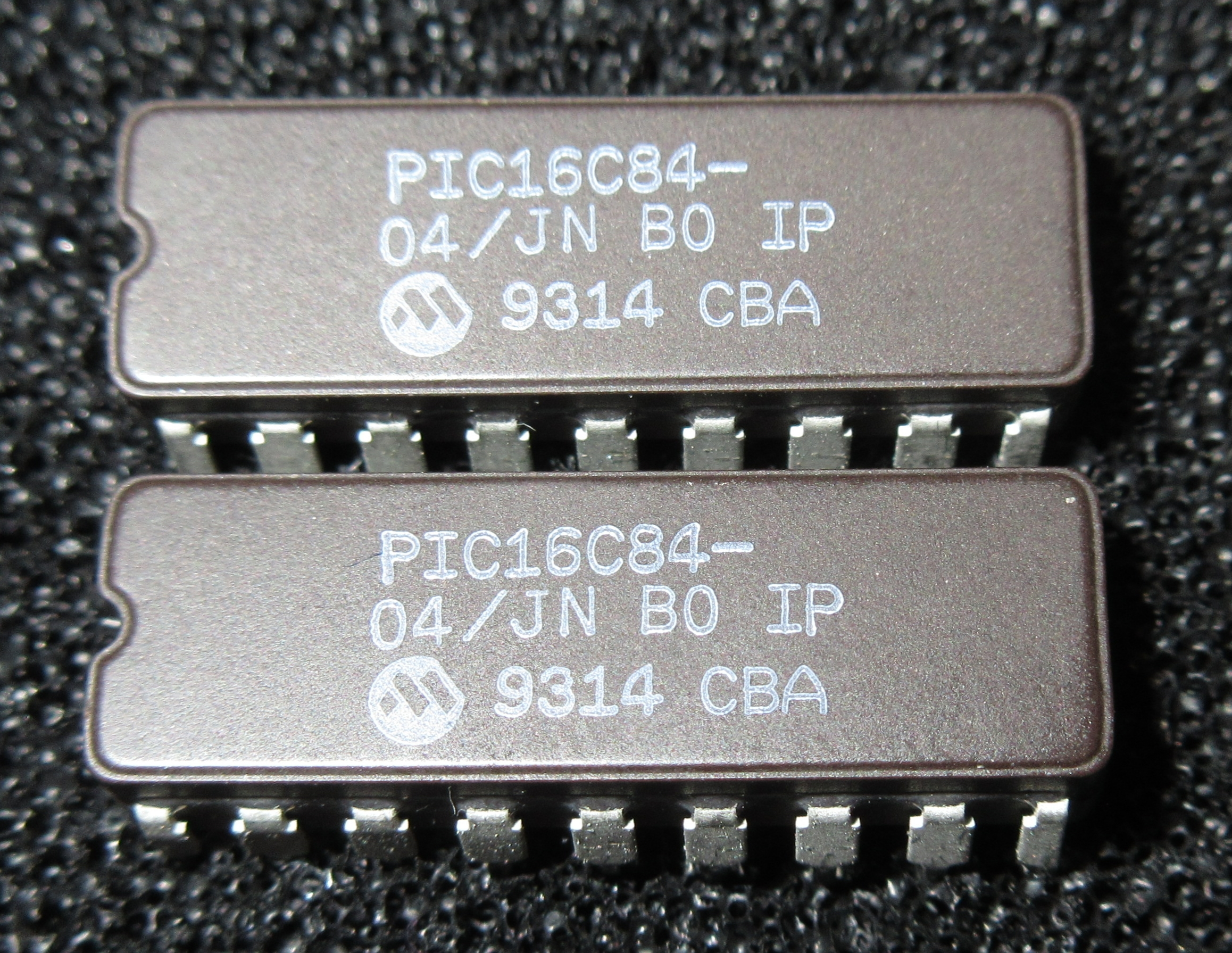
Two Microchip PIC16C84 chips

The PIC16C84, PIC16F84 and PIC16F84A are 8-bit microcontrollers of which the EEPROM based PIC16C84 was the first introduced in March 16 1993 at the suggested retail price of $3.72 in quantities of 10,000. It is a member of the PIC family of controllers, produced by Microchip Technology. The memory architecture makes use of bank switching. Software tools for assembler, debug and programming were only available for DOS and Microsoft Windows 3.X operating systems.

== Description ==
The PIC16x84 is a microcontroller in the PIC family of controllers produced by Microchip Technology. It was Microchip's first microcontroller that utilised "EEPROM" memory technology for the program memory. The use of "EEPROM" technology for program memory has now been disused in favour of "FLASH" memory that is considerably cheaper to manufacture. Both "EEPROM" and "FLASH" utilise similar forms of "floating gate" technologies to operate. The device features one 8-bit timer, and 13 I/O pins. The PIC16x84 became popular in many hobbyist applications because it uses a serial programming algorithm that lends itself to very simple programmers. Additionally, the PIC16C84 uses EEPROM memory, so it is easy to erase and requires no special tools to do so. The PIC16F84 and its updated version, the PIC16F84A both utilised FLASH program memory. The PIC16C84, PIC16C84A, PIC16F84 and the PIC16F84A all contain an additional 64 Bytes of EEPROM addressed from the "DATA" memory map. This additional memory is intended for use as "user data", hence the reason it can only be addressed from the "DATA" memory mapping.

== F-version ==
The PIC16F84/PIC16F84A is an improved version of the PIC16C84, and almost completely compatible, with better program security and using flash memory instead of EEPROM memory for program memory. The PIC16F84/PIC16F84A has 68 bytes of RAM whilst the PIC16C84 has 36 bytes.

Since the two chips are so similar they are often referred to by the term PIC16x84 (x is used as a wildcard when referring to chips).

== History ==
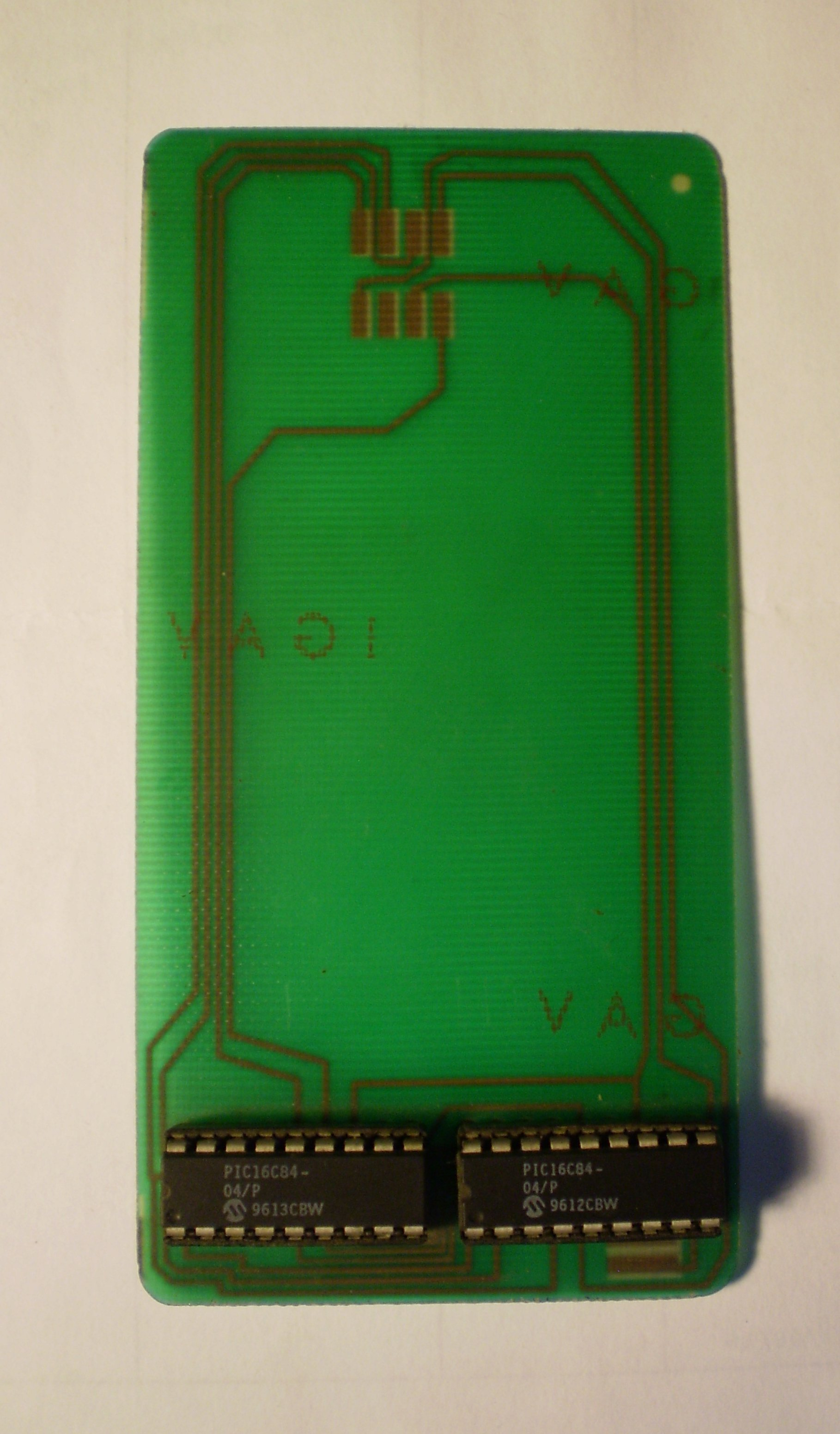
Two PIC16C84s on a false smart-card used in the nineties to decode the signals of Sky Television.

The PIC16C84 was introduced in 1993 and has been hailed as the first PIC microcontroller to feature a serial programming algorithm and EEPROM memory (it was preceded by the Motorola MC68HC805B6 and MC68HC805C4 along with the MC68HC11E2 with serial bootloader and EEPROM program storage released in the late 1980s. These chips lend themselves to hobby use: only a simple and cheap programmer is required to program, erase and reprogram the chip. As PIC16C84 supplies became limited due to it being discontinued, the PIC16F84 became popular as it is an almost drop-in replacement. New programming software was needed as the programming algorithm is different but the programming hardware required was the same.

Even later (1998) Microchip Technology introduced the improved PIC16F84A which allowed for faster clock speeds (up to 20 MHz), faster programming, and decreased the current draw of the chip.

The PIC16x84 microcontroller is a member of Microchip's 14-bit series (the instruction word size is 14 bits for all instructions), making the '84 a good development prototype for other similar but cheaper one-time-programmable 14-bit devices.

== Recent pin-compatible variants ==
Microchip's product line has gone through many revisions since the 16x84 and more powerful, flexible, cheaper pin-compatible PICs have been developed.

Existing PIC 16x84 code may require some modifications for these variants, namely making sure pins with multiple functions have been set up properly.

- PIC16F84A - 1.75KB program memory size, 68 bytes data memory, 64 bytes EEPROM, 1× timer.
- PIC16F628A - 3.5KB program memory size, 224 bytes data memory, 128 bytes EEPROM, 3× timers, PWM (via CCP module), onboard 4 MHz/37 kHz RC oscillator.
- PIC16F648A - 7KB program memory size, 256 bytes data memory, 256 bytes EEPROM, 3× timers, PWM (via CCP module), onboard 4 MHz/37 kHz RC oscillator.
- PIC16F88 - Nanowatt Technology variant, 7KB program memory size, 368 bytes data memory, 256 bytes EEPROM, 3× timers, hardware PWM, on-board 8 MHz/37 kHz precision oscillator, 7-input 10-bit ADC, synchronous serial port supporting SPI and I²C.
- PIC16F1827 - Nanowatt XLP Technology variant, 7KB program memory size, 384 bytes data memory, 256 bytes EEPROM, 5× timers, hardware PWM, on chip 32 MHz/31 kHz precision oscillator, 12-input 10-bit ADC, 4× PLL.
- PIC16F1847 - Nanowatt XLP Technology variant, 14KB program memory size, 1024 bytes data memory, 256 bytes EEPROM, 5× timers, hardware PWM, on chip 32 MHz/31 kHz precision oscillator, 12-input 10-bit ADC, 4× PLL. 5-bit DAC.

The latter two are 8-bit enhanced mid-range core with 14 additional instructions and optimizations for the C Programming Language.

== See also ==
- PIC microcontroller
- Atmel AVR, competitor since 1996 (while PIC's maker bought Atmel in 2016 and now sells these chips too)
