= Motorola 68HC16 =

The 68HC16 (also abbreviated as HC16) is a highly modular microcontroller family based on the CPU16 16-bit core from Motorola Semiconductor (later from Freescale then NXP). The CPU16 core is a true 16-bit design, with an architecture that is very familiar to 68HC11 (HC11) users. The resemblances to the HC11 core design are a deliberate move to provide an upgrade path for those 8-bit 68HC11 designs that require the increased power of a 16-bit CPU. Many features of the HC16 and the CPU16 core are new to HC11 users.

The HC16 provides a software upgrade path for HC11 users while giving full hardware compatibility with the asynchronous address and data bus found on the 32-bit microprocessors.
