= C166 family =

Family of 16-bit microcontrollers

The C166 family is a 16-bit microcontroller architecture from Infineon (formerly the semiconductor division of Siemens) in cooperation with STMicroelectronics. It was first released in 1990 and is a controller for measurement and control tasks. It uses the well-established RISC architecture, but features some microcontroller-specific extensions such as bit-addressable memory and an interrupt system optimized for low-latency. When this architecture was introduced the main focus was to replace 8051 controllers (from Intel).

Opcode-compatible successors of the C166 family are the C167 family, XC167 family, the XE2000 family and the XE166 family.

As of 2017, microcontrollers using the C166 architecture are still being manufactured by NIIET in Voronezh, Russia, as part of the 1887 series of integrated circuits. This includes a radiation-hardened device under the designation 1887VE6T (Russian: 1887ВЕ6Т).

== C167 / ST10 family ==
The Siemens/Infineon C167 family or STMicroelectronics ST10 family is a further development of the C166 family. It has improved addressing modes and support for "atomic" instructions. Variants include, for example, Controller Area Network (CAN bus).

C167 architecture is used predominantly on German and German-owned automobile marques as well as certain models from Renault, Dacia, Peugeot, Citroen, Hyundai, Kia etc.

== See also ==
- Capture compare unit (CCU, CAPCOM)
- Peripheral Event Controller (PEC)
