= R8C =

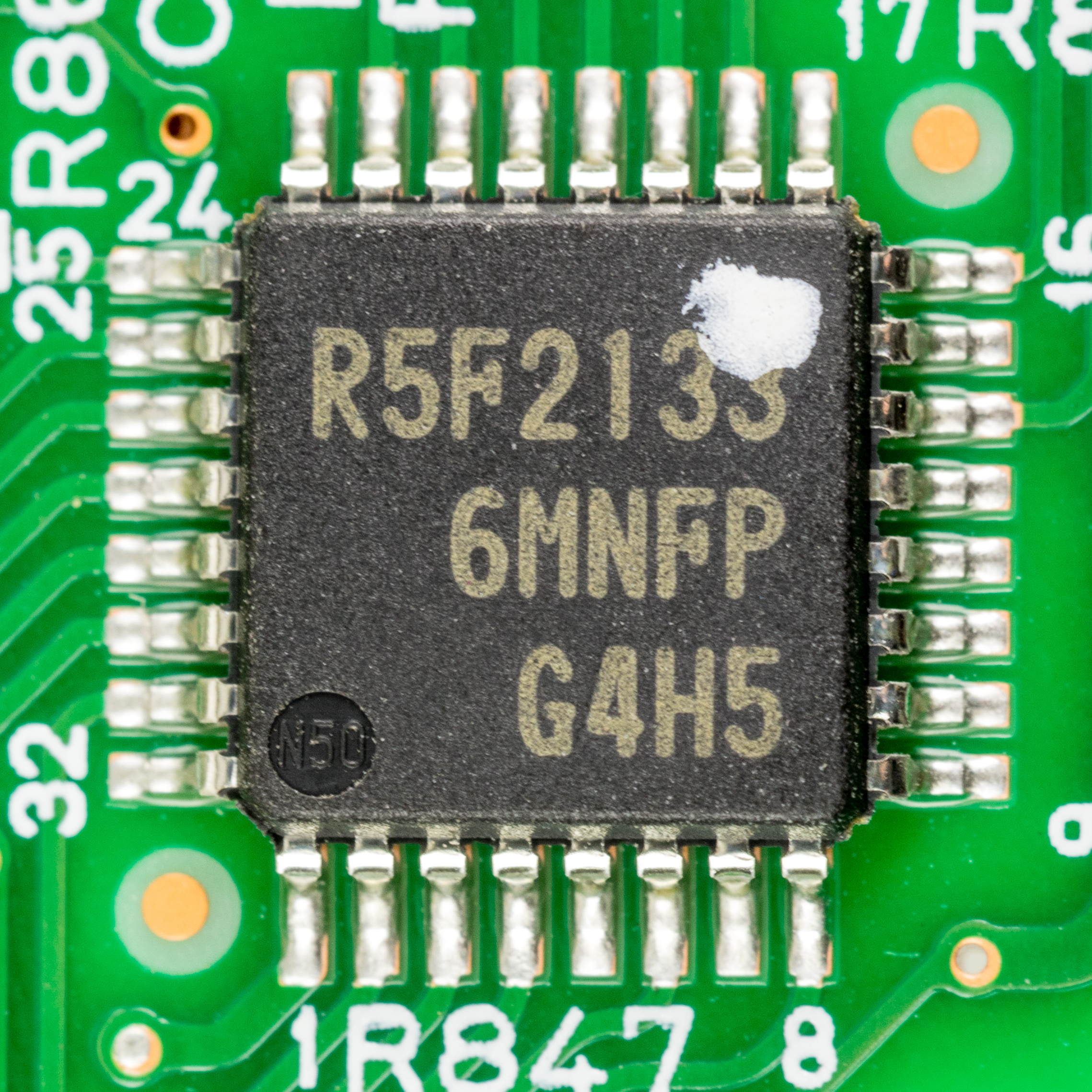
Renesas R8C/33M (R5F21336MNFP)

The Renesas R8C is a 16-bit microcontroller that was developed as a smaller and cheaper version of the Renesas M16C. It retains the M16C's 16-bit CISC architecture and instruction set, but trades size for speed by cutting the internal data bus from 16 bits to 8 bits. It is available in a number of different versions with varying amounts of flash memory and SRAM.

== Members of the R8C family ==
All R8C have an internal ring oscillator and can be used without an external resonator. Common interfaces are UART and some devices have CAN interfaces. Some devices have an internal data flash which is meant as a replacement for a serial EEPROM, although it handles less write cycles as a real serial EEPROM. R8C devices have OCD (On Chip Debugging, see in-circuit emulator). When debugging with the Renesas E8 debugger or E8a debugger, UART 1 cannot be used. The debug interface uses only four wires: Vcc, GND, Reset and Mode.

=== R8C/11 ===
- 8-16k flash memory

=== R8C/13 ===
- 8-16k flash memory

Key features:

1. 4 port I/O
2. Four Timers (X,Y,Z,C) each other 8 bit, except C timer 16 Bit.plus watch timer 15 bit
3. 10 bit*12 channel A/D converter
4. 8 bit*1 channel UART or clock synchronous serial I/O, plus 8 bit 1 canal UART
5. System Clock Generator Xin-X out (High-Low Speed On Chip Oscillator)
6. CPU Core And more Memory

=== R8C/18 ===
- 4-16k flash memory

=== R8C/19 ===
- 4-16k flash memory

=== R8C/1A ===
- 4-16k flash memory

=== R8C/1B ===
- 4-16k flash memory

=== R8C/20 ===
- 32-128k flash memory

=== R8C/21 ===
- 32-48k flash memory

=== R8C/22 ===
- 32-48k flash memory
- CAN interface

=== R8C/23 ===
- 32-48k flash memory
- CAN interface

=== R8C/24 ===
- 16-32kbyte flash memory

=== R8C/25 ===
- 16-32k flash memory

=== R8C/26 ===
- 8-32k flash memory

=== R8C/27 ===
- 8-32k flash memory

=== R8C/28 ===
- 8-16k flash memory

=== R8C/29 ===
- 8-16k flash memory

=== R8C/2A ===
- 48-96k flash memory

=== R8C/2B ===
- 48-96k flash memory

=== R8C/2C ===
- 48-96k flash memory

=== R8C/2D ===
- 48-96k flash memory

=== See also ===
- M16C
- M32C
