= Motorola 68HC08 =

Microcontroller

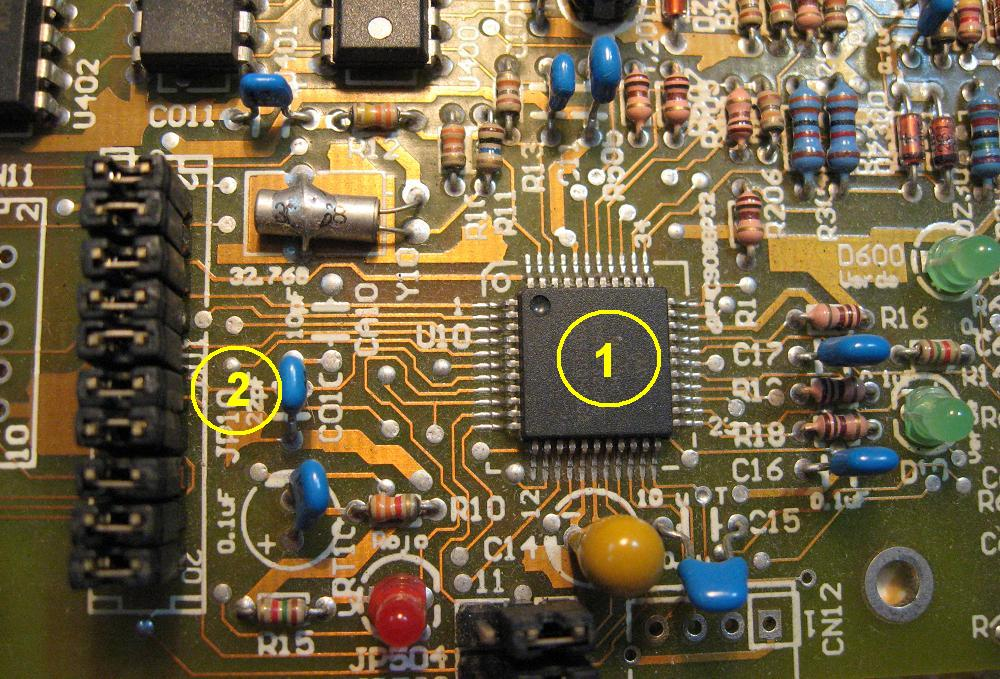
One microcontroller 68HC08GP32 mounted on a PCB with debug connector.

The 68HC08 (also abbreviated as HC08) is a broad family of 8-bit microcontrollers from Motorola Semiconductor (later from Freescale then NXP).

HC08's are fully code-compatible with their predecessors, the Motorola 68HC05. Like all Motorola processors that share lineage from the 6800, they use the von Neumann architecture as well as memory-mapped I/O. This family has five CPU registers that are not part of the memory. One 8-bit accumulator A, a 16-bit index register H:X, a 16-bit stack pointer SP, a 16-bit program counter PC, and an 8-bit condition code register CCR. Some instructions refer to the different bytes in the H:X index register independently.

Among the HC08's there are dozens of processor families, each targeted to different embedded applications. Features and capabilities vary widely, from 8 to 64-pin processors, from LIN connectivity to USB 1.1. A typical and general purpose device from the HC08 family of units is the microcontroller M68HC908GP32.

The Freescale RS08 core is a simplified, "reduced-resource" version of the HC08.

The Freescale HCS08 core is the next generation of the same processors.
