= Motorola 68HC05 =

Series of 8-bit microcontrollers

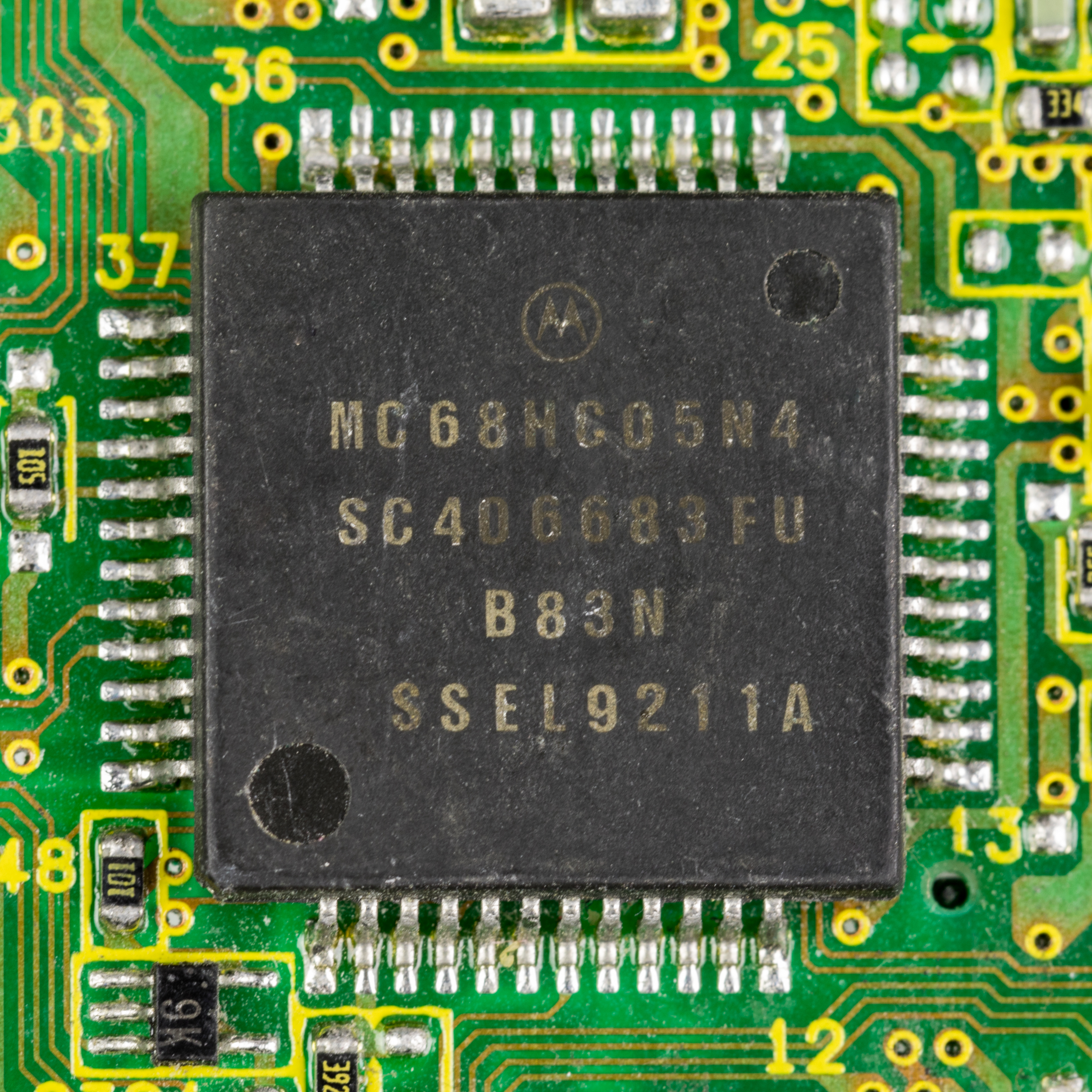
Motorola MC68HC05N4

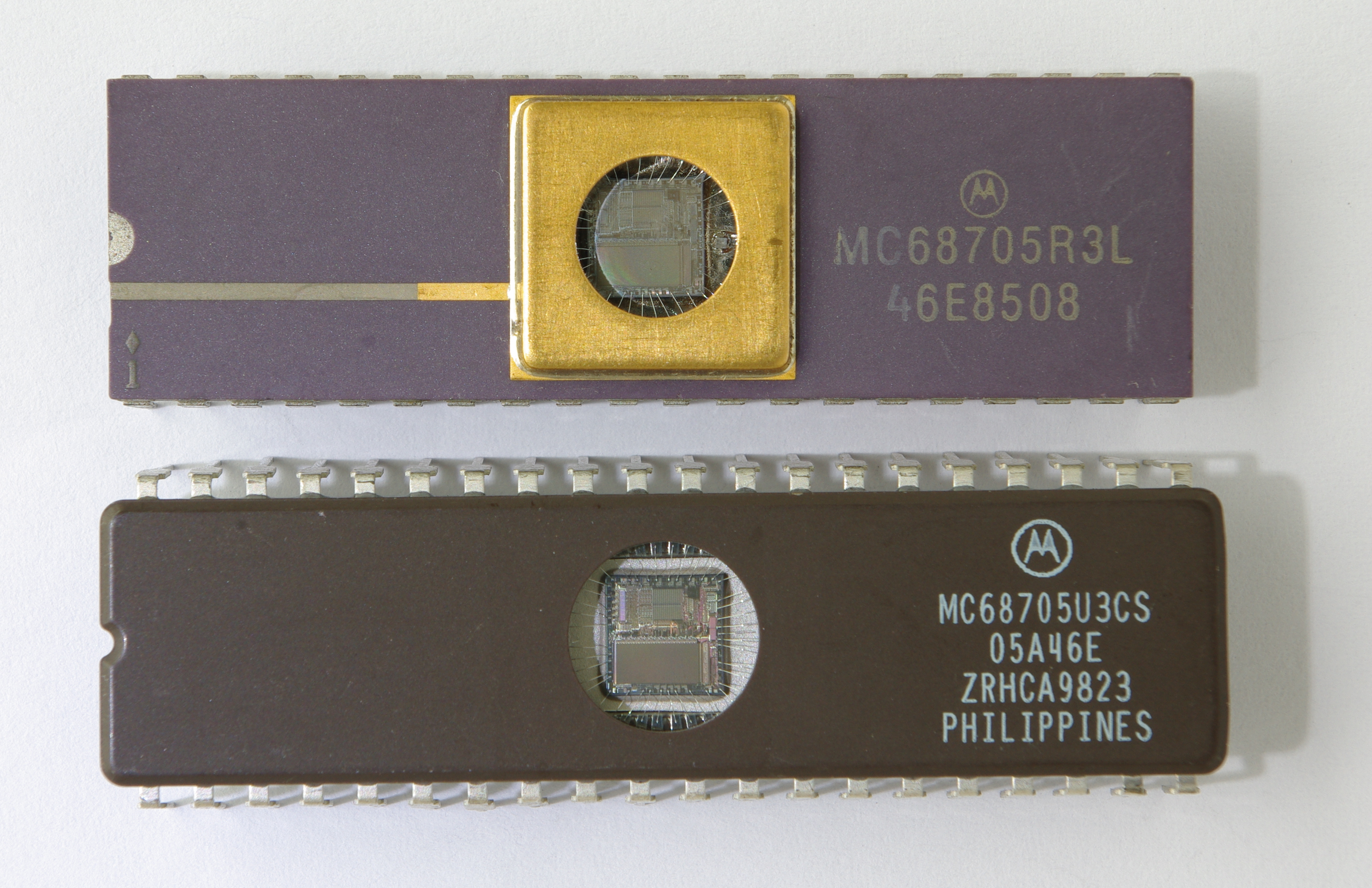
Two Motorola MC68705 in Ceramic Dual in-line package

Motorola M68HC05P1 Microcontroller die shot

The 68HC05 (also abbreviated as HC05) is a broad family of 8-bit microcontrollers from Motorola Semiconductor (later Freescale then NXP).

Like all Motorola processors that share lineage from the 6800, they use the von Neumann architecture as well as memory-mapped I/O. This family has five CPU registers that are not part of the memory: an 8-bit accumulator A, an 8-bit index register X, an 8-bit stack pointer SP with two most significant bits hardwired to 1, a 13-bit program counter PC, and an 8-bit condition code register CCR.

Among the HC05's there are several processor families, each targeted to different embedded applications.

The 68HC05 family broke ground with the introduction of the EEPROM-based MC68HC805C4 and MC68HC805B6 variants in the late 1980s. Using a serial bootloader, they could be programmed in-circuit with simple software running on a PC and a low current 19 V supply (no programmer required).

The HC05 series is now considered legacy and is replaced by the HC(S)08 MCU series.

== Nomenclature ==
MC6805xx	Motorola's first microcontroller family, implemented in HMOS
MC68705xx	MC6805 parts with EPROM instead of masked ROM
MC146805xx	MC6805 parts implemented in CMOS
MC1468705xx	MC146805 parts with EPROM instead of masked ROM
MC68HC05xx	MC6805 parts implemented in high-speed CMOS
MC68HC805xx	MC68HC05 parts with EEPROM
