= X68000 =

1987 home computer

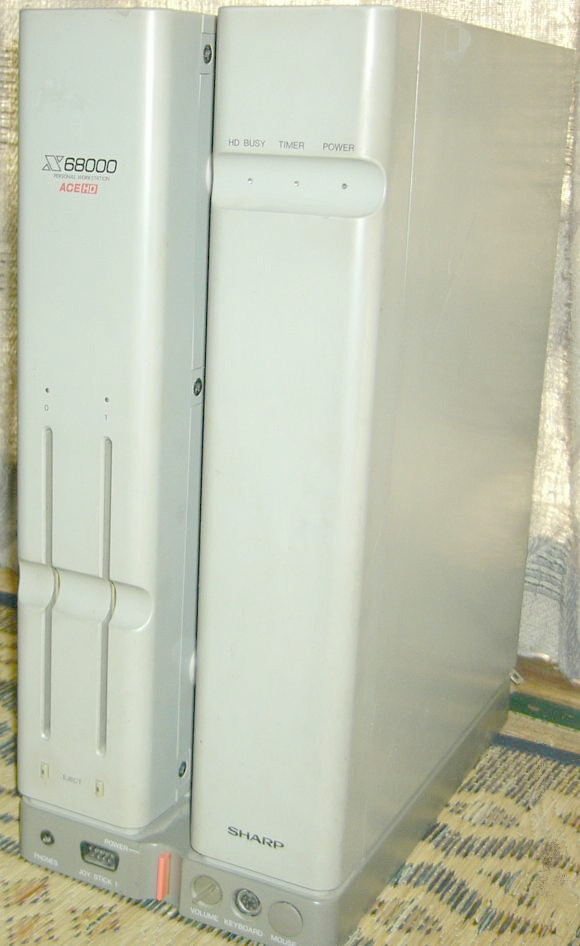
- X68000ACE-HD
- Developer: Sharp Corporation
- Manufacturer: Sharp Corporation
- Type: Home computer
- Generation: Fourth generation
- Released: 1987
- Lifespan: 1987–1999/2000
- Discontinued: 1999/2000
- Media: Floppy disk
- Operating system: Human68k, NetBSD, OS-9
- CPU: Motorola 68000 family
- Memory: 1 to 12 MB of RAM
- Display: 14-inch CRT; 256×240 to 1024×1024 pixels 16 bits
- Graphics: VINAS 1 + 2, VSOP, CYNTHIA / Jr, RESERVE
- Sound: Yamaha YM2151; OKI MSM6258
- Controller input: D-pad, Keyboard, Mouse
- Power: 100V AC 50/60 Hz
- Predecessor: X1

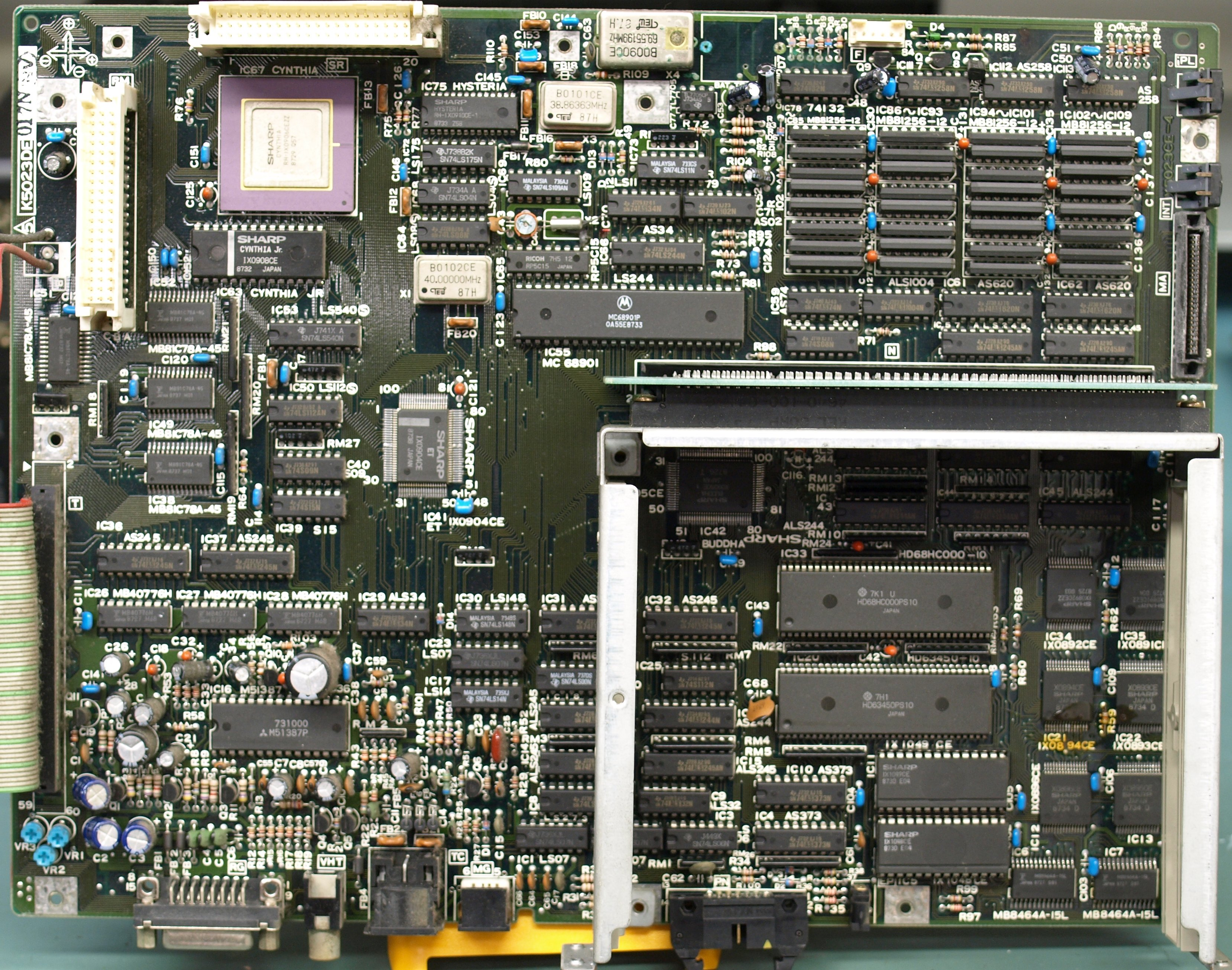
Main processor board of original 1987 CZ-600C model

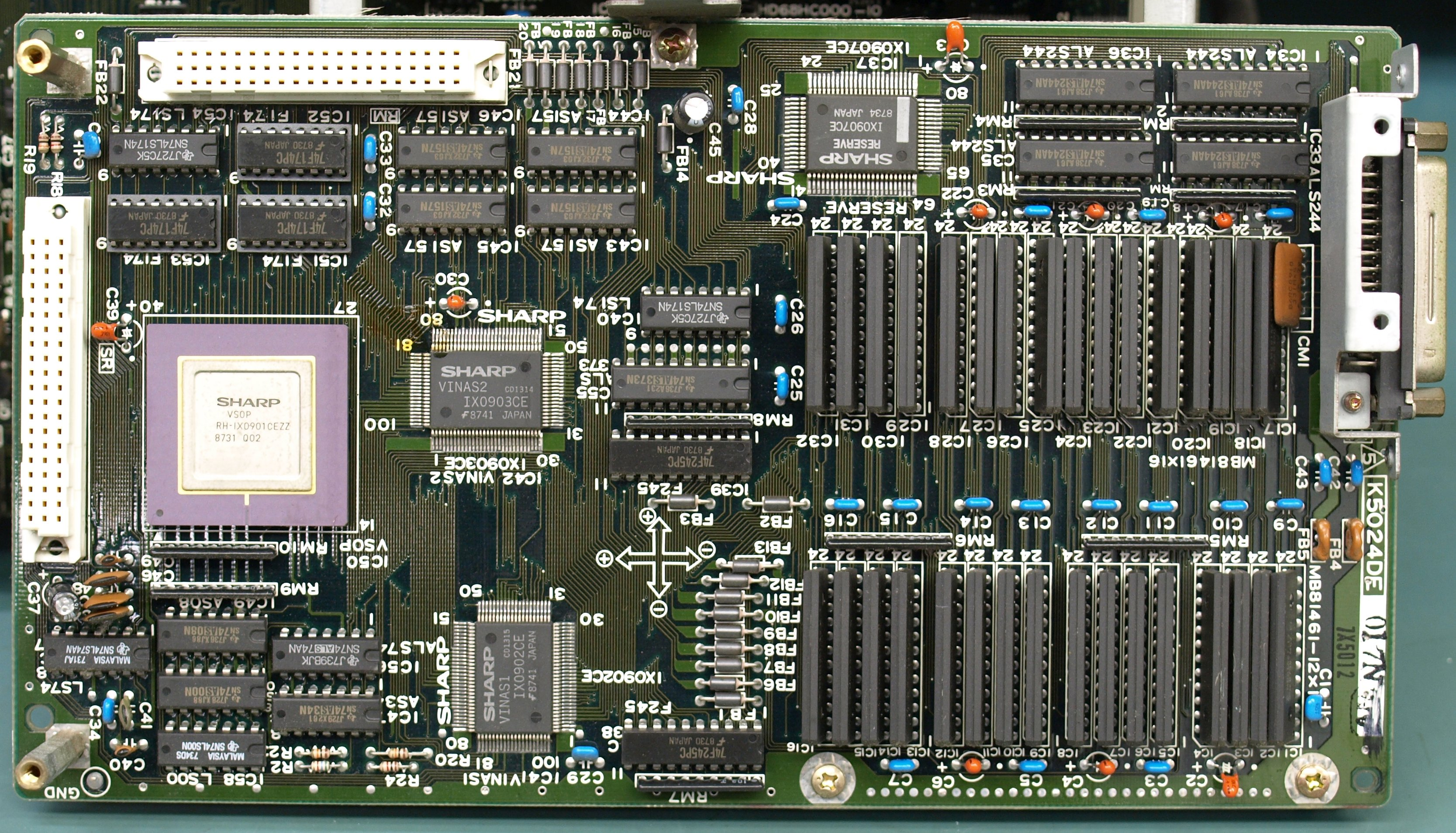
Video board of original 1987 CZ-600C model

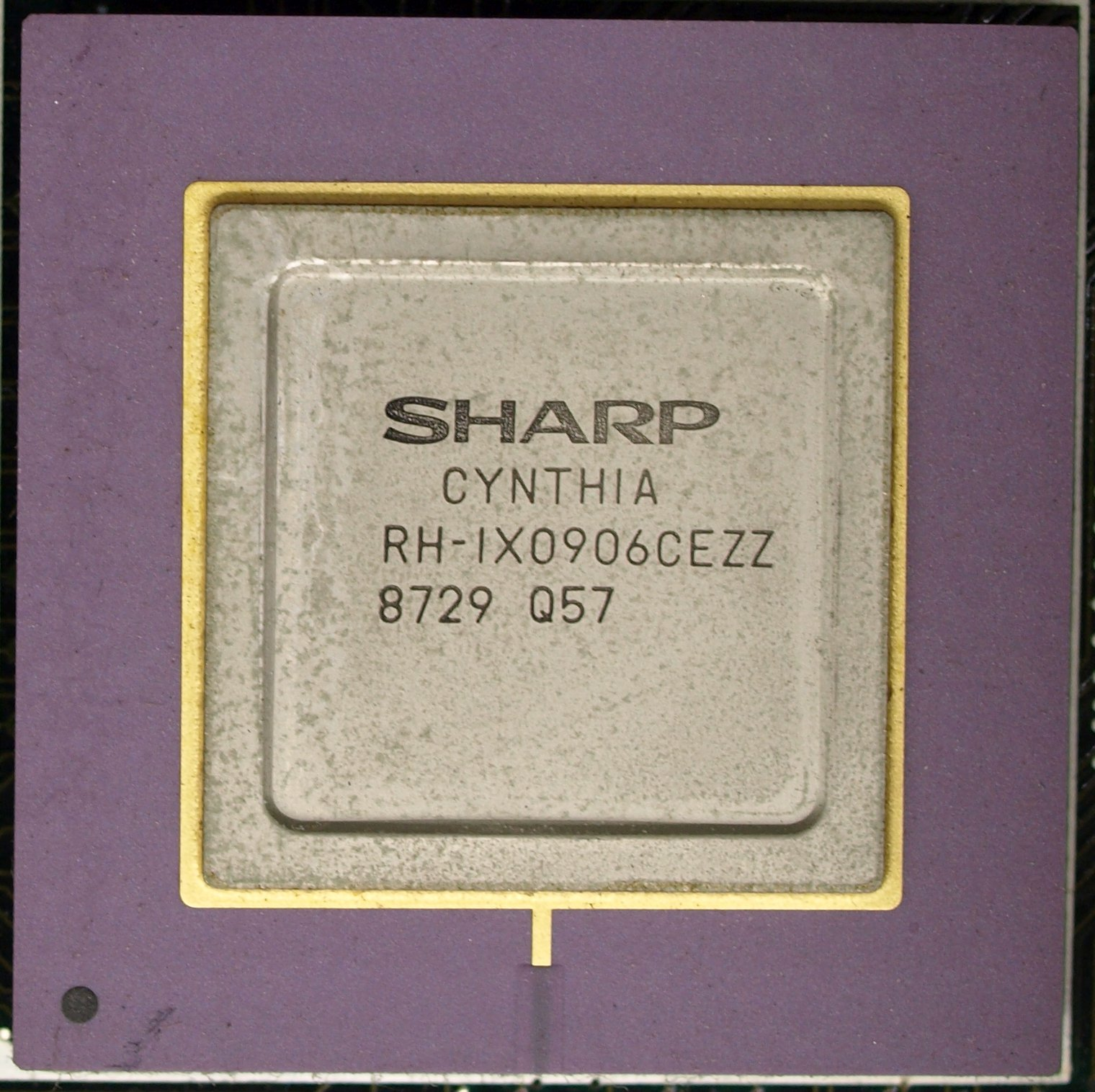
Cynthia sprite chip in the original 1987 CZ-600C model

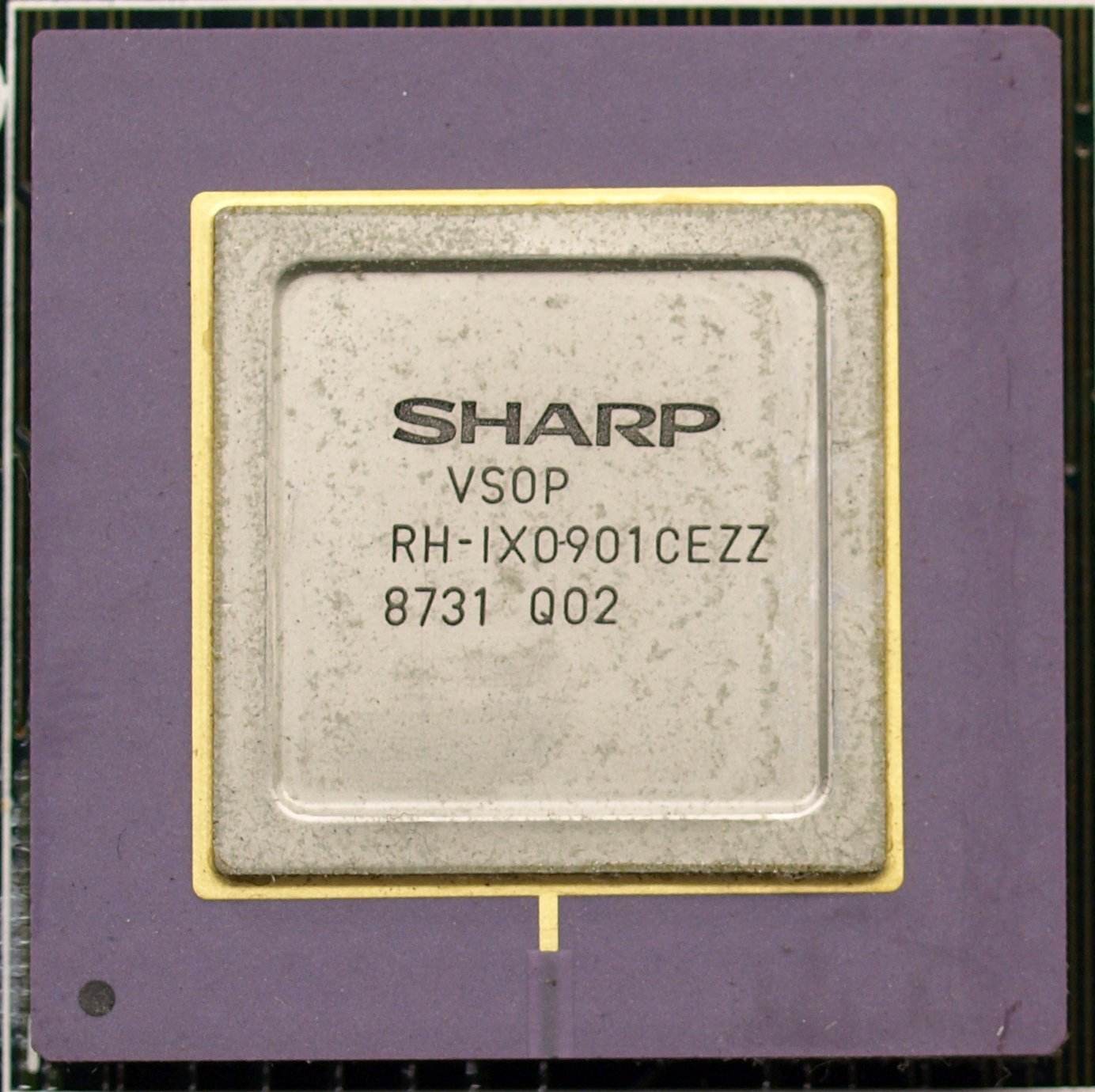
VSOP Video processing chip in the original 1987 CZ-600C model

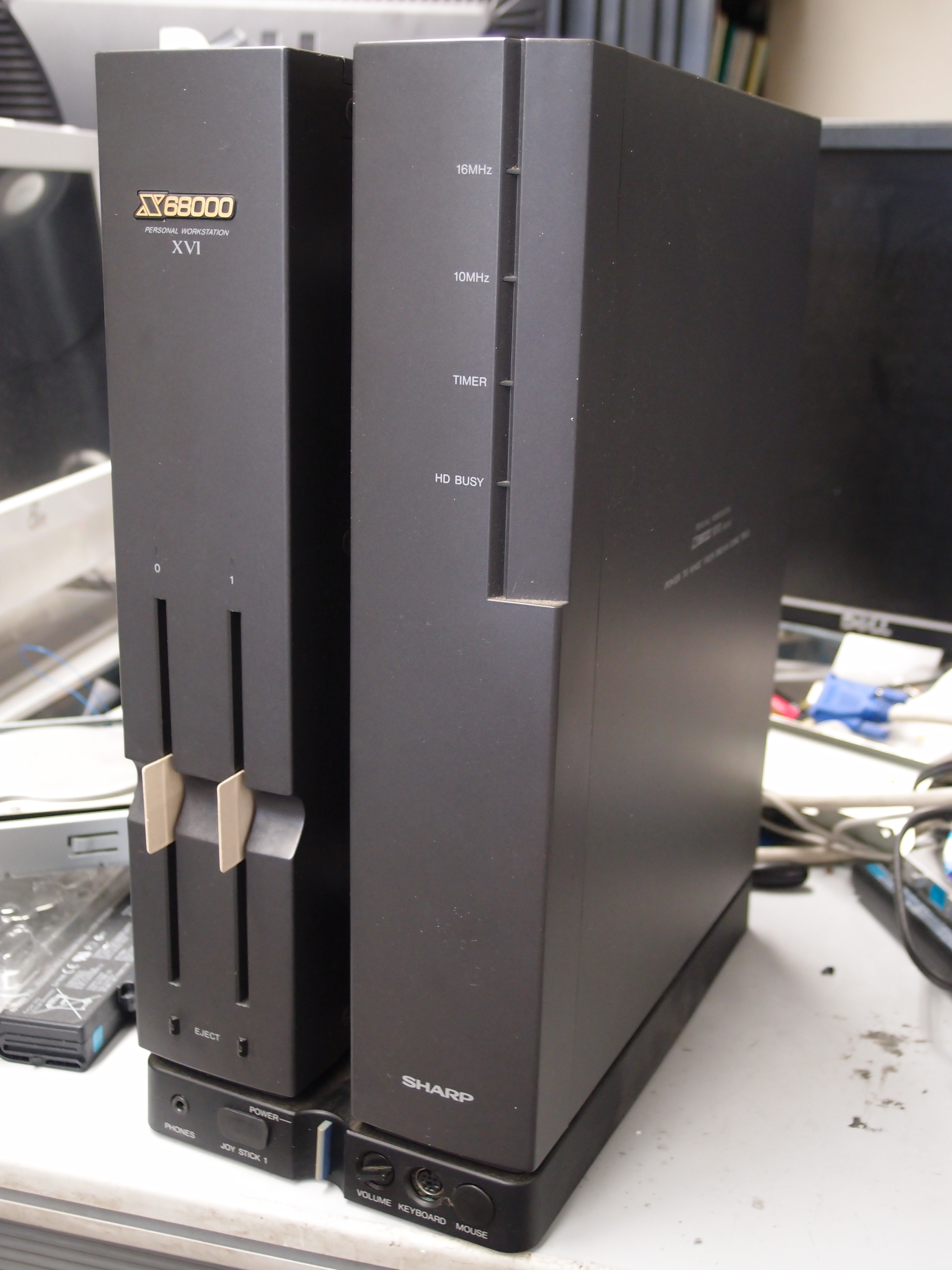
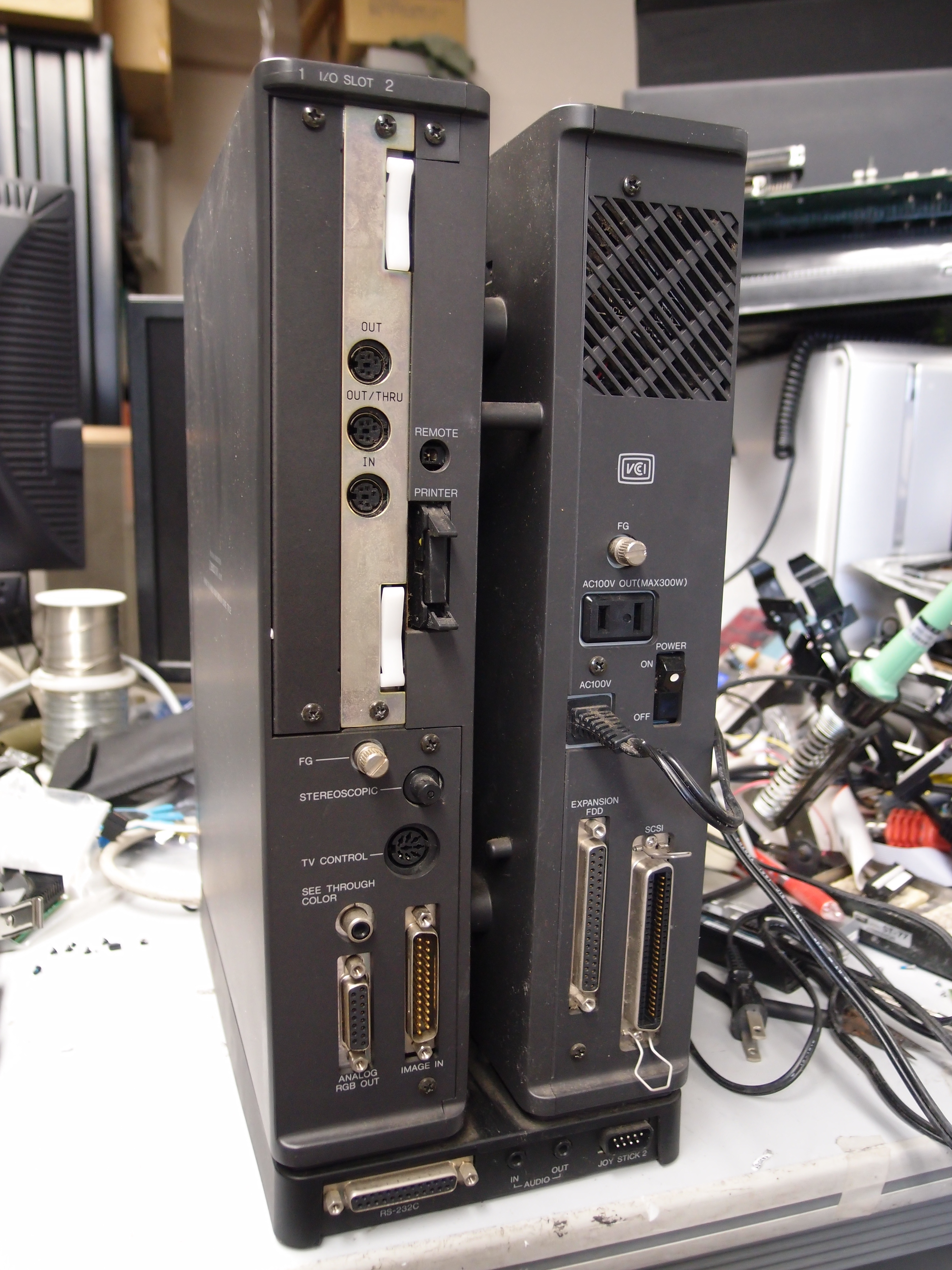
Sharp X68000 XVI front and back

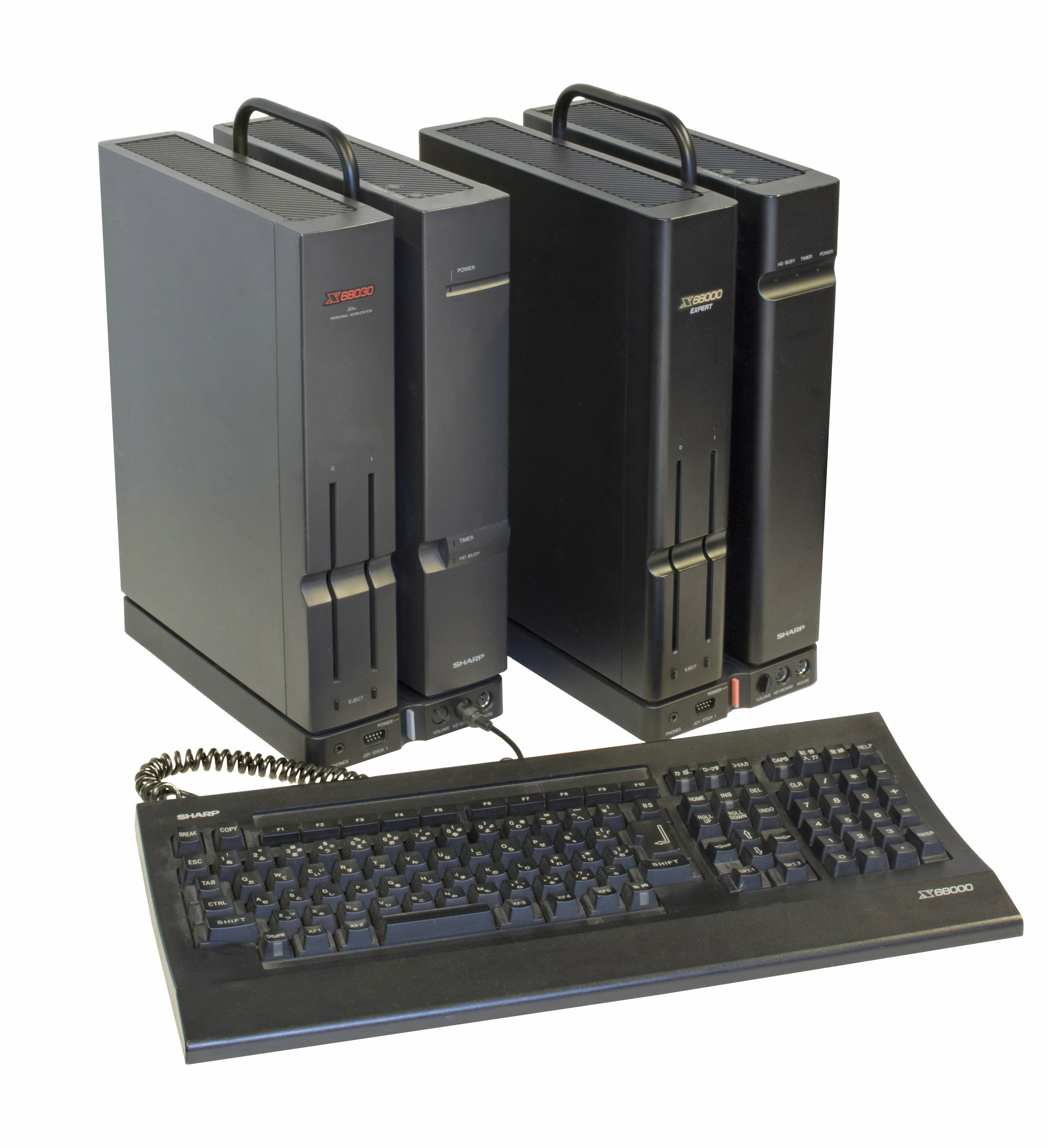
Sharp X68030 and X68000 Expert

The X68000 (Japanese: エックス ろくまんはっせん, Hepburn: Ekkusu Rokuman Hassen) is a home computer created by Sharp Corporation. It was first released in 1987 and sold only in Japan.

The initial model has a 10 MHz Motorola 68000 CPU and 1 MB of RAM, and lacks a hard drive. The final model was released in 1993 with a 25 MHz Motorola 68030 CPU, 4 MB of RAM, and optional 80 MB SCSI hard drive. RAM in these systems is expandable to 12 MB, though most games and applications do not require more than 2 MB.

The X68000 has graphics hardware similar to arcade video games of the late-1980s, with custom coprocessors supporting scrolling, tiled backgrounds, and large numbers of sprites. Sound is supplied through multiple sound chips supporting 8 channels of FM synthesis and one channel of adaptive differential pulse-code modulation audio, which are mixed down to 2 analog stereo channels via a DAC chip. As such, video gaming was a major use of the X68000.

== Operating system ==
The X68k runs an operating system called Human68k which was developed for Sharp by Hudson Soft. An MS-DOS-workalike, Human68k features English-based commands very similar to those in MS-DOS; executable files have the extension .X. Versions of the OS prior to 2.0 have command line output only for common utilities like "format" and "switch", while later versions included forms-based versions of these utilities. At least three major versions of the OS were released, with several updates in between.

Early models have a GUI called "VS" or "Visual Shell"; later ones were originally packaged with SX-Window. A third GUI called Ko-Window exists with an interface similar to Motif. These GUI shells can be booted from floppy disk or the system's hard drive. Most games also boot and run from floppy disk; some are hard disk installable and others require hard disk installation.

Since the system's release, software such as Human68k itself, console, SX-Window C compiler suites, and BIOS ROMs have been released as public domain software and are freely available for download. Other operating systems available include OS-9 and NetBSD for X68030.

== Case design ==
The X68000 has two soft-eject 5.25-inch floppy drives, or in the compact models, two 3.5-inch floppy drives, and a very distinctive case design of two connected towers, divided by a retractable carrying handle. This system was also one of the first with a software-controlled power switch; pressing it signals the system's software to save and shut down. The screen fades to black and the sound fades to silence before the system turns off.

The system's keyboard has a mouse port built into either side. The front of the computer has a headphone jack, volume control, joystick, keyboard and mouse ports. The top has a retractable carrying handle only on non-Compact models, a reset button, and a non-maskable interrupt (NMI) button. The rear has a variety of ports, including stereoscopic output for 3D goggles, FDD and HDD expansion ports, and I/O board expansion slots.

== Display ==
The monitor supports horizontal scanning rates of 15, 24, and 31 kHz and functions as a cable-ready television (NTSC-J standard) with composite video input. It was a high quality monitor for playing JAMMA-compatible arcade boards due to its analog RGB input and support for all three horizontal scanning rates used with arcade games.

== Disk I/O ==
Early machines use the rare Shugart Associates System Interface (SASI) for the hard disk interface; later versions adopted the industry-standard Small Computer System Interface (SCSI). Per the hardware's capability, formatted SASI drives can be 10, 20 or 40 MB in size and can be logically partitioned as well.

Human68K does not support the VFAT long filenames standard of modern Windows systems, but it supports 18.3 character filenames instead of the 8.3 character filenames allowed in the FAT filesystem. By default, Human68K will not consider any additional characters beyond the first 8 without the use of a special driver, therefore files and folders that are named the same when viewed through a 8.3 filename but different when viewed through a 18.3 filename will be considered the same. Human68K is case sensitive and allows lower case and Shift JIS encoded Kanji characters in filenames, both of which cause serious problems when a DOS system tries to read such a directory. If a X68000 user restricts themselves to use only filenames according to the 8.3 characters scheme of DOS, using only Latin upper case characters, then a disk written on the X68000 is fully compatible with other Japanese standard platforms like e.g. the NEC PC-8801, the Fujitsu FMR and FM Towns computers. The Japanese standard disk format used by the X68000 is: 77 tracks, 2 heads, 8 sectors, 1024 bytes per sector, 360 rpm (1232 KiB).

== Expansion ==
Many add-on cards were released for the system, including networking (Neptune-X), SCSI, memory upgrades, CPU enhancements (JUPITER-X 68040/060 accelerator), and MIDI I/O boards. The system has two joystick ports, both 9-pin male and supporting Atari standard joysticks and MSX controllers. Capcom produced a converter that was originally sold packaged with the X68000 version of Street Fighter II that allowed users to plug in a Super Famicom or a 6-button Mega Drive controller into the system. The adapter was made specifically so that users could plug in the Capcom Power Stick Fighter controller into the system.

== List of X68000 series ==
Release Date	model name	model number	CPU	body		RAM	Expan- sion I/O slot	FDD	HDD			Bundle software
Release Date	model name	model number	CPU	color	shape	RAM	Expan- sion I/O slot	FDD	SASI	SCSI	size	Bundle software
1987/03	X68000	CZ-600C	Hitachi; HD68HC000; 10 MHz (Motorola; 68000 clone)	Gray/Black	Tower	1 MB	2	5¼ ×2	o	–	–	Human68k ver1.0 (OS); Gradius (game)
1988/03	X68000 ACE	CZ-601C	Hitachi; HD68HC000; 10 MHz (Motorola; 68000 clone)	Gray/Black	Tower	1 MB	2	5¼ ×2	o	–	–	Human68k ver1.01
1988/03	X68000 ACE-HD	CZ-611C	Hitachi; HD68HC000; 10 MHz (Motorola; 68000 clone)	Gray/Black	Tower	1 MB	2	5¼ ×2	o	–	20 MB	Human68k ver1.01
1989/03	X68000 EXPERT	CZ-602C	Hitachi; HD68HC000; 10 MHz (Motorola; 68000 clone)	Gray/Black	Tower	2 MB	2	5¼ ×2	o	–	–	Human68k ver2.0
1989/03	X68000 EXPERT-HD	CZ-612C	Hitachi; HD68HC000; 10 MHz (Motorola; 68000 clone)	Gray/Black	Tower	2 MB	2	5¼ ×2	o	–	40 MB	Human68k ver2.0
1989/03	X68000 PRO	CZ-652C	Hitachi; HD68HC000; 10 MHz (Motorola; 68000 clone)	Gray/Black	Horizontal	1 MB	4	5¼ ×2	o	–	–	Human68k ver2.0
1989/03	X68000 PRO-HD	CZ-662C	Hitachi; HD68HC000; 10 MHz (Motorola; 68000 clone)	Gray/Black	Horizontal	1 MB	4	5¼ ×2	o	–	40 MB	Human68k ver2.0
1990/03	X68000 EXPERT II	CZ-603C	Hitachi; HD68HC000; 10 MHz (Motorola; 68000 clone)	Gray/Black	Tower	2 MB	2	5¼ ×2	o	–	–	Human68k ver2.0 SX-Window ver2.0
1990/03	X68000 EXPERT II-HD	CZ-613C	Hitachi; HD68HC000; 10 MHz (Motorola; 68000 clone)	Gray/Black	Tower	2 MB	2	5¼ ×2	o	–	40 MB	Human68k ver2.0 SX-Window ver2.0
1990/04	X68000 PRO II	CZ-653C	Hitachi; HD68HC000; 10 MHz (Motorola; 68000 clone)	Gray/Black	Horizontal	1 MB	4	5¼ ×2	o	–	–	Human68k ver2.0 SX-Window ver2.0
1990/04	X68000 PRO II-HD	CZ-663C	Hitachi; HD68HC000; 10 MHz (Motorola; 68000 clone)	Gray/Black	Horizontal	1 MB	4	5¼ ×2	o	–	40 MB	Human68k ver2.0 SX-Window ver2.0
1990/06	X68000 SUPER-HD	CZ-623C	Hitachi; HD68HC000; 10 MHz (Motorola; 68000 clone)	Titan Black	Tower	2 MB	2	5¼ ×2	–	o	80 MB	Human68k ver2.01 SX-Window ver2.0
1991/01	X68000 SUPER	CZ-604C	Hitachi; HD68HC000; 10 MHz (Motorola; 68000 clone)	Titan Black	Tower	2 MB	2	5¼ ×2	–	o	–	Human68k ver2.01 SX-Window ver2.0
1991/05	X68000 XVI	CZ-634C	Motorola; 68000; 16 MHz	Titan Black	Tower	2 MB	2	5¼ ×2	–	o	–	Human68k ver2.02 SX-Window ver2.0
1991/05	X68000 XVI-HD	CZ-644C	Motorola; 68000; 16 MHz	Titan Black	Tower	2 MB	2	5¼ ×2	–	o	80 MB	Human68k ver2.02 SX-Window ver2.0
1992/02	X68000 Compact	CZ-674C	Motorola; 68000; 16 MHz	Gray	mini Tower	2 MB	2	3 1/2 ×2	–	o	–	Human68k ver2.03 SX-Window ver2.0
1993/03	X68030	CZ-500	Motorola; MC68EC030; 25 MHz	Titan Black	Tower	4 MB	2	5¼ ×2	–	o	–	Human68k ver3.0 SX-Window ver3.0
1993/03	X68030-HD	CZ-510	Motorola; MC68EC030; 25 MHz	Titan Black	Tower	4 MB	2	5¼ ×2	–	o	80 MB	Human68k ver3.0 SX-Window ver3.0
1993/05	X68030 Compact	CZ-300	Motorola; MC68EC030; 25 MHz	Titan Black	mini Tower	4 MB	2	3 1/2 ×2	–	o	–	Human68k ver3.02 SX-Window ver3.0
1993/05	X68030 Compact-HD	CZ-310	Motorola; MC68EC030; 25 MHz	Titan Black	mini Tower	4 MB	2	3 1/2 ×2	–	o	80 MB	Human68k ver3.02 SX-Window ver3.0
(Cancel- led)	Power X (provisional name)	CZ-xxxx	IBM; PowerPC 601; 66 MHz	Titan Black	Tower	8 MB	2	3 1/2 ×2	–	o	240 MB	SX-Window ver4.0

== Technical specifications ==
=== Processors ===
- Main CPU (central processing unit)
  - X68000 (1987) to SUPER (1991) models – Hitachi HD68HC000 (16/32-bit) @ 10 MHz
  - XVI (1991) to Compact (1992) models – Motorola 68000 (16/32-bit) @ 16 MHz
  - X68030 (1993) models – Motorola MC68EC030 (32-bit) @ 25 MHz
- Sub-CPU: Oki MSM80C51 MCU
- GPU (graphics processing unit) chipset: Sharp-Hudson Custom Chipset
  - X68000 (1987) model – CYNTHIA Jr/Sr Sprite Controller, VINAS CRT Controller, VSOP Video Controller, RESERVE Video Data Selector
  - ACE (1988) to X68030 (1993) models – CYNTHIA Sprite Controller, VICON CRT Controller, VIPS Video Controller, CATHY Video Data Selector
- Sound chips:
  - Yamaha YM2151: Eight FM synthesis channels
  - Yamaha YM3012: Floating point DAC with 2-channel stereo output
  - Oki MSM6258: One 4-bit ADPCM mono channel @ 15.6 kHz sampling rate

=== Memory ===
- ROM: 1 MB (128 KB BIOS, 768 KB Character Generator)
- Main RAM: 1–4 MB (expandable up to 12 MB)
- VRAM: 1056 KB
  - 512 KB graphics
  - 512 KB text
  - 32 KB sprites
- SRAM: 16 KB static RAM

=== Graphics ===
- Color palette: 65,536 (16-bit RGB high color depth)
- Maximum colors on screen: 65,536 (in 512×512 resolution)
- Screen resolutions (all out of 65,536 color palette)
  - 256×240 pixels @ 16 to 65,536 colors
  - 256×256 pixels @ 16 to 65,536 colors
  - 512×240 pixels @ 16 to 65,536 colors
  - 512×256 pixels @ 16 to 65,536 colors
  - 512×512 pixels @ 16 to 65,536 colors
  - 640×480 pixels @ 16 to 64 colors
  - 768×512 pixels @ 16 to 64 colors
  - 1024×1024 pixels @ 16 to 64 colors
- Graphics hardware (VINAS 1 + 2, VSOP, CYNTHIA / Jr, RESERVE): Hardware scrolling, priority control, super-impose, dual tilemap background layers, sprite flipping
- Graphical planes: 1–4 bitmap planes, 1–2 tilemap planes, 1 sprite plane
  - Bitmap planes
    - 1 layer: 512×512 resolution @ 65,536 colors on screen, or 1024×1024 resolution @ 64 colors on screen (out of 65,536 color palette)
    - 2 layers: 512×512 resolution @ 256 colors on screen per layer (512 colors combined) (out of 65,536 color palette)
    - 4 layers: 512×512 resolution @ 16 colors on screen per layer (64 colors combined) (out of 65,536 color palette)
  - BG tilemap planes
    - BG plane resolutions: 256×256 (2 layers) or 512×512 (1 layer)
    - BG chip/tile size: 8×8 or 16×16
    - Colors per BG layer: 256 (out of 65,536 color palette)
    - BG colors on screen: 256 (1 layer) or 512 (2 layers), out of 65,536 color palette
    - BG tiles on screen: 512 (16×16 tiles in 256×256 layers) to 4096 (8×8 tiles in 512×512 layer)
  - Sprite plane
    - Sprite count: 128 sprites on screen, 32 sprites per scanline, 256 sprite patterns in VRAM (can be multiplied up to 512 sprites on screen with scanline raster interrupt method)
    - Sprite size: 16×16
    - Colors per sprite: 16 colors per palette, selectable from 16 palettes (out of 65,536 color palette)
    - Sprite colors on screen: 256 (out of 65,536 color palette)
    - Sprite tile size: 8×8 or 16×16
    - Sprite tile count: 128 (16×16) to 512 (8×8) on screen, 256 (16×16) to 1024 (8×8) in VRAM

=== Other specifications ===
- Expansion: 2 card slots (4 on Pro models)
- I/O Ports:
  - 2 MSX compatible joystick ports
  - Audio IN / OUT
  - Stereo scope/3D goggles port
  - TV/monitor Control
  - RGB/NTSC Video Image I/O
  - Expansion (2 slots)
  - External FDD (up to 2)
  - SASI/SCSI (depending on model)
  - RS232 serial port
  - Parallel port
  - Headphone and microphone ports
- Floppy Drives:
  - Two soft-eject 5.25-inch floppy drives, 1.2 MB each
  - Two 3.5-inch floppy drives, 1.44 MB each (compact models)
- Hard Disk: 20-80 MB SASI/SCSI (depending on model)
- Operating Systems: Human68k (MS DOS-alike developed by Hudson), SX-Windows GUI
- Power Input: AC 100 V, 50/60 Hz
- Weight: ~8 kg (~10 kg Pro)

=== Optional upgrades ===
- Upgradable CPU:
  - HARP: Motorola 68000 @ 20 MHz
  - REDZONE: Motorola 68000 @ 24 MHz
  - X68030 D'ash: Motorola 68030 @ 33 MHz
  - Xellent30: Motorola 68030 @ 40 MHz
  - HARP-FX: Motorola 68030 @ 50 MHz
  - Xellent40: Motorola 68040 @ 33 MHz
  - 060Turbo: Motorola 68060 @ 50 MHz
  - Jupiter-EX: Motorola 68060 @ 66 MHz
  - Venus-X/060: Motorola 68060 @ 75 MHz
- Additional CPU:
  - CONCERTO-X68K: NEC V30 @ 8 MHz, with 512 KB RAM
  - VDTK-X68K: NEC V70 @ 20 MHz, with 2 MB DRAM and 128 KB SRAM
- FPU (floating-point unit) coprocessor:
  - Sharp CZ-6BP1
  - Sharp CZ-6BP2: Motorola 68881 @ 16 MHz
  - Sharp CZ-5MP1: Motorola 68882 @ 25 MHz
  - Xellent30: Motorola 68882 @ 33 MHz
  - Tsukumo TS-6BE6DE: Motorola MC68882, with 6 MB RAM
- Sound card:
  - Sharp CZ-6BM1: MIDI card
  - System Sacom SX-68M: MIDI card
  - System Sacom SX-68M-2: MIDI card
  - Marcury-Unit: 16-bit stereo PCM @ 48 kHz sampling rate, 2× Yamaha YMF288 FM synthesis sound chips
- Graphics accelerator & sound card: Tsukumo TS-6BGA
  - Graphics chip: Cirrus Logic CL-GD5434 (1994)
  - VRAM: 2 MB (2048 KB) 64-bit DRAM
  - Color palette: 16,777,216 (24-bit RGB true color depth) and alpha channel (RGBA)
  - Maximum colors on screen: 16,777,216
  - Maximum resolution: 2048×1024 pixels
  - Screen resolutions (all out of 16,777,216 color palette)
    - 768×512 pixels @ 32,768 to 16,777,216 colors
    - 800×600 pixels @ 32,768 to 16,777,216 colors
    - 1024×512 pixels @ 32,768 to 16,777,216 colors
    - 1024×768 pixels @ 32,768 to 16,777,216 colors
    - 1024×1024 pixels @ 32,768 colors
    - 1280×1024 pixels @ 256 colors
    - 2048×1024 pixels @ 256 colors
  - Graphical capabilities: 64-bit GUI acceleration, blitter, bit blit
  - Audio capabilities: 16-bit stereo PCM @ 48 kHz sampling rate
- Hard disk drive storage:
  - Sharp CZ-5H08: 80 MB
  - Sharp CZ-68H: 81 MB
  - Sharp CZ-5H16: 160 MB

== Legacy ==
In 2022, ZUIKI Inc. revealed a teaser for a new mini console called the X68000 Z, a miniaturized version of the X68000.

== See also ==
- X1, the predecessor of the X68000
