= Ceibo emulator =

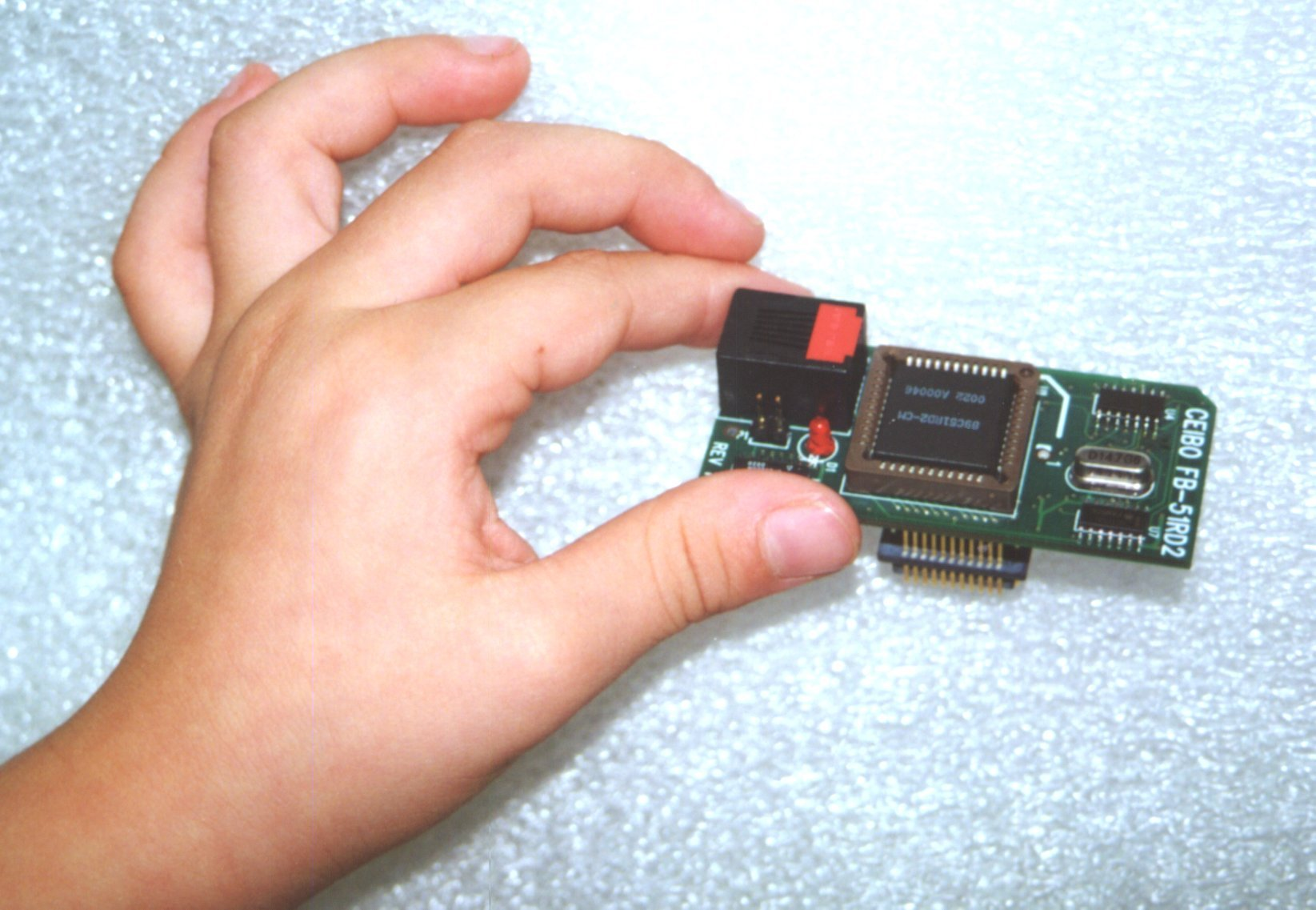
Atmel 8051 in-circuit emulator

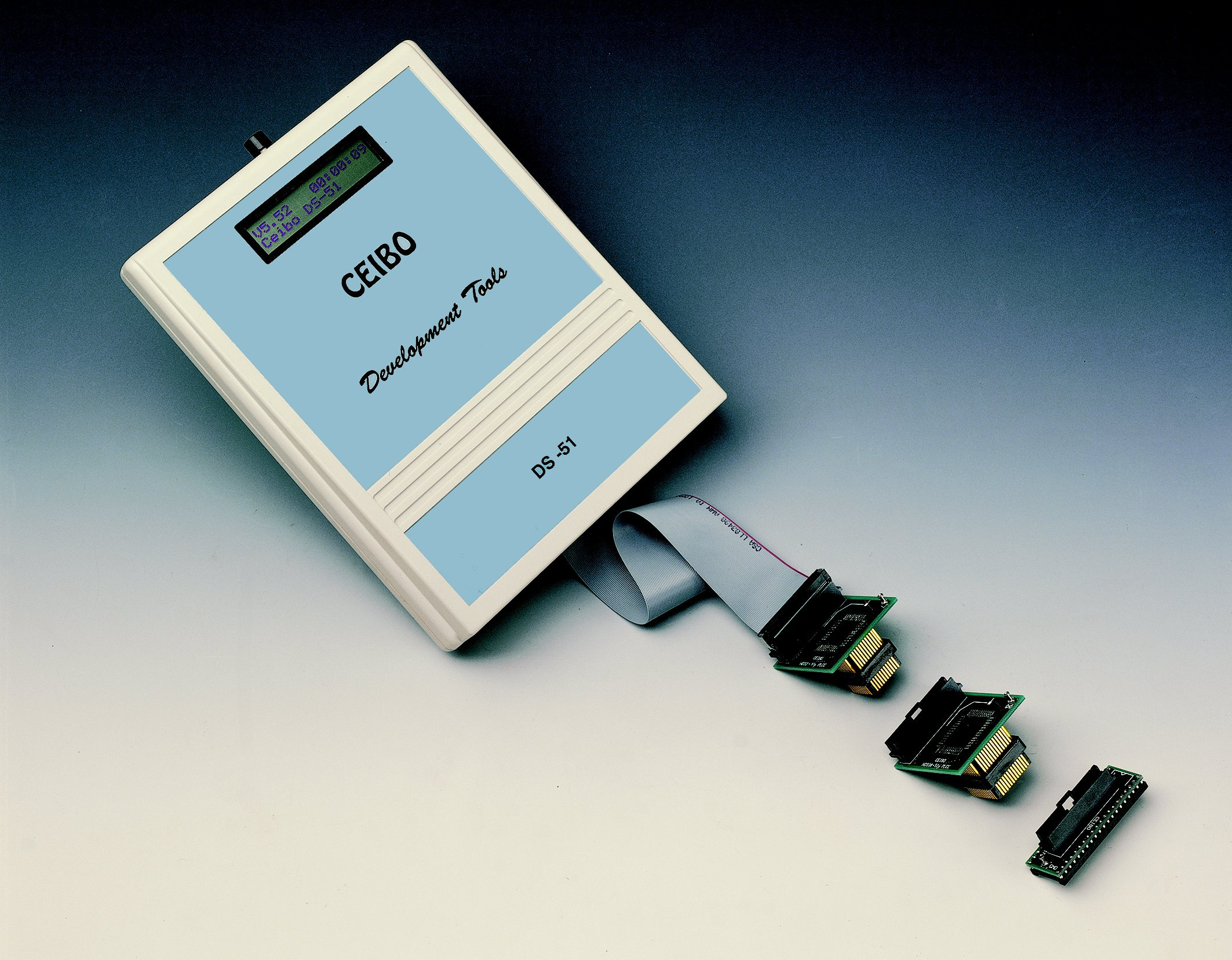
8051 emulator with adapters

A ceibo emulator is an in-circuit emulator for microcontrollers and microprocessors.

These emulators use bond-out processors, which have internal signals brought out for the purpose of debugging. These signals provide information about the state of the processor that is otherwise unobtainable.

Supported microprocessors and microcontrollers include Atmel, Dallas Semiconductor, Infineon, Intel, Microchip, NEC, Philips, STMicroelectronics and Winbond.
