= Ceibo =

Ceibo or ceiba is the Hispanicized form of a word of Taíno origin; it may refer to:

== Plants ==
- Ceiba: a genus of large trees in the family Malvaceae, commonly known as "ceibas" or "ceibos" in many Hispano-American countries
- Ceiba pentandra: (also known as kapok), a large tropical tree often referred to as "ceiba" or "ceibo" in various Spanish-speaking regions
- Erythrina crista-galli: (also known as cockspur coral tree), a flowering tree native to South America and the national tree and flower of Argentina and Uruguay
- Ceiba trichistandra, the ceibo de Guayaquil or ceibo de costa, a species native to the dry equatorial forests of Ecuador and northern Peru
- Ceiba speciosa, the silk floss tree (formerly Chorisia speciosa), known as palo borracho
- Ceiba insignis, the white floss silk tree, found in southern Ecuador and Peru
- Ceiba chodatii, the specialized palo borracho of the Gran Chaco region (Argentina, Paraguay, and Bolivia)
- Pseudobombax septenatum, a tree known as ceibo barrigón due to its swollen trunk, found from Nicaragua to Brazil

== Military ==
- Exercise Ceibo: a combined military manoeuvre and civil protection exercise performed periodically by the Argentine and Uruguayan air forces (and other branches) to strengthen regional cooperation and emergency response

== Technology ==
- Ceibo, the manufacturer of Ceibo emulators

== Astronomy ==
- Ceibo, the official name of star HD 63454
