= In-circuit =

in-circuit is an adjective that is used in following terms:

- In-circuit debugging
- In-circuit emulation
- In-circuit emulator
- In-circuit programming
