= SX-Window =

GUI for Sharp X68000 computers

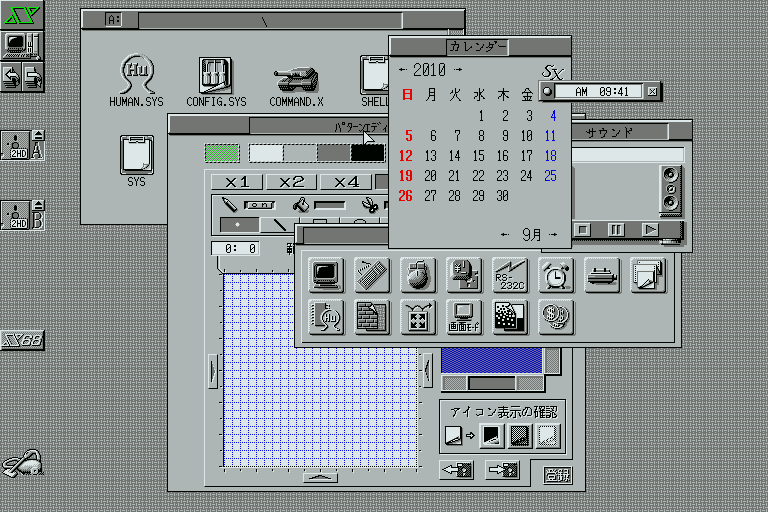
- A screenshot of SX-Window 3.0/ 3.1
- Developer: Sharp Corporation and Hudson Soft
- Initial release: 1989; 37 years ago
- Latest release: 3.1 / 1993; 33 years ago
- Supported platforms: Motorola 68000 series
- License: Proprietary
- Preceded by: VS (Visual Shell)

SX-Window is a graphic user interface (GUI) operating system for the Sharp X68000 series of computers, which were popular in Japan. It was first released in 1989 and had its last update in 1993. It runs on top of the Human68k disk operating system.

== History ==
SX-Window was introduced for X68000 in 1989, and came preinstalled on the X68000 EXPERT model. It was developed by Hudson. The final release was 3.1 in 1993. In 2000, Sharp released the system software for the X68000 free-of-charge, including SX-Window.

== Technical details ==
The look and feel of the GUI is like that of the NeXTSTEP operating system, and its API is similar to the Macintosh Toolbox. It uses non-preemptive multitasking with the event-driven paradigm. It has a garbage collection system without MMU of MPU, but it was difficult to program because all pointers derived from handles become invalid once any API is called. The X68000 was very powerful for game software, but this GUI could be slow, as no hardware acceleration card was supported. Only a few applications and games were developed for this system.
