= Background debug mode interface =

Debugging interface for embedded systems

Background debug mode (BDM) interface is an electronic interface that allows debugging of embedded systems. Specifically, it provides in-circuit debugging functionality in microcontrollers. It requires a single wire and specialized electronics in the system being debugged. It appears in many Freescale Semiconductor products. Background commands are categorized into two types: Non-intrusive commands and Active background commands. Non-intrusive commands can be issued while the user program is running, which include memory access commands.

The interface allows a Host to manage and query a target. Specialized hardware is required in the target device. No special hardware is required in the host; a simple bidirectional I/O pin is sufficient.

== I/O signals ==
The signals used by BDM to communicate data to and from the target are initiated by the host processor. The host negates the transmission line, and then either

- Asserts the line sooner, to output a 1,
- Asserts the line later, to output a 0,
- Tri-states its output, allowing the target to drive the line. The host can sense a 1 or 0 as an input value.

At the start of the next bit time, the host negates the transmission line, and the process repeats. Each bit is communicated in this manner.

In other words, the increasing complexity of today's software and hardware designs is leading to some fresh approaches to debugging. Silicon manufacturers offer more and more on-chip debugging features for emulation of new processors.

This capability, implemented in various processors under such names as background debug mode (BDM), JTAG and on-chip in-circuit emulation, puts basic debugging functions on the chip itself. With a BDM (1 wire interface) or JTAG (standard JTAG) debug port, you control and monitor the microcontroller solely through the stable on-chip debugging services.

This debugging mode runs even when the target system crashes and enables developers to continue investigating the cause of the crash.

== Microcontroller application development ==
A good development tool environment is important to reduce total development time and cost. Users want to debug their application program under conditions that imitate the actual setup of their system. Because of that, the capability to debug a user program in an actual target system is required. This is known as in-circuit debugging. Furthermore, most new MCUs have nonvolatile memory such as flash memory so that programming code on the target system is also required. This is known as in-circuit programming.

To support in-circuit debugging and programming requirements, the HC08 Family has the monitor mode and the HCS08 and RS08 utilize a background debug mode (BDM). The background debug hardware on the HCS08 consists of a background debug controller (BDC) and debug module (DBG). The background debug hardware on the RS08 consists of the background debug controller (BDC) only.

== BDM commands ==
The BDM host can issue commands with parameters to the target. Some commands allow reading or writing of blocks of the target's memory, individual registers in the CPU, or registers not available to the target.

Examples include:

BDM commands
READ_BYTE	Read a byte from memory
WRITE_BYTE	Write a byte to memory
GO	Start/resume executing at current program counter location
WRITE_PC	Write a value to the program counter
READ_PC	Read the value of the program counter
WRITE_X	Write a value to the index register
READ_X	Read the value of the index register
READ_SP	Read the value of the stack pointer

== BDM functions ==
Depending on the target part, the BDM controller may feature a hardware breakpoint register. The register holds a value indicating an address in memory. When the target part's CPU accesses that location in memory, the BDM hardware can take control of the target part, stop program execution, and begin operating in background mode.
