= HP 64000 =

Software development system

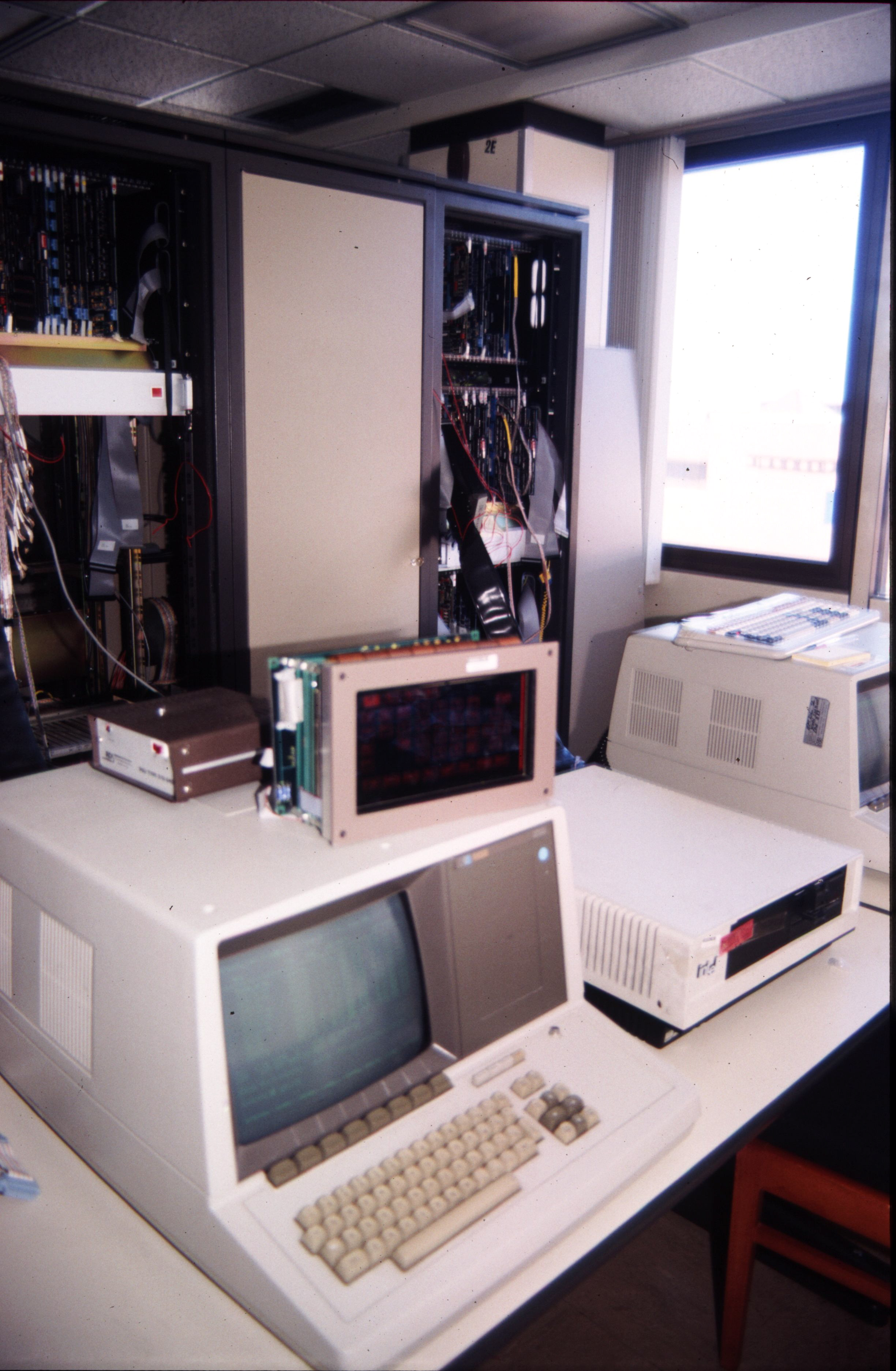
An HP64000 system photographed in 1987

The HP 64000 Logic Development System, introduced 17 September 1979, is a tool for developing hardware and software for products based on commercial microprocessors from a variety of manufacturers. The systems assisted software development with assemblers and compilers for Pascal and C, provided hardware for in-circuit emulation of processors and memory, had debugging tools including logic analysis hardware, and a programmable read-only memory (PROM) chip programmer. A wide variety of optional cards and software were available tailored to particular microprocessors. When introduced the HP 64000 had two distinguishing characteristics. First, unlike most microprocessor development systems of the day, such as the Intel Intellec and Motorola EXORciser, it was not dedicated to a particular manufacturer's microprocessors, and second, it was designed such that up to six workstations could be connected via the HP-IB (IEEE-488) instrumentation bus to a common hard drive and printer to form a tightly integrated network.

== Models ==
- 64100A, introduced in 1979, was a desktop workstation which contained ten expansion slots for various optional cards. The initial offering of this workstation required an external hard disk for all disk storage, although the disk could be shared by up to six workstations via the HP-IB (IEEE-488) instrumentation bus. Later, a dual floppy drive option was added so that a workstation could be used without the shared hard drive. This workstation's CPU was the BPC, the same custom HP 16-bit microprocessor found in the HP 9845 workstations. Software and hardware was offered to develop 8-bit and 16-bit microprocessors.
- 64110A, a more portable workstation ("luggable") with five card slots, was introduced in 1983. Its CPU was the same custom HP microprocessor as the 64100A.
- 64120A card cage introduced in 1986. It fit the same option cards as the 64100A and 64110A, and was connected via an IEEE-488 bus to a standard HP 9000 Series 300 workstation running the HP-UX operating system rather than using a specially designed workstation such as the 64100A and 64110A. The name "HP 64000-UX Microprocessor Development Environment" was used with these systems. Software and hardware was introduced for development of 32-bit microprocessors.
- 64700A card cage was introduced in 1988. It was marketed as a lower cost development system (compared to the 64120A) that could be operated with an IBM PC-compatible personal computer rather than a workstation. Cards for this system carried the numbers 647xx, and were not compatible with the other systems.

== Description ==
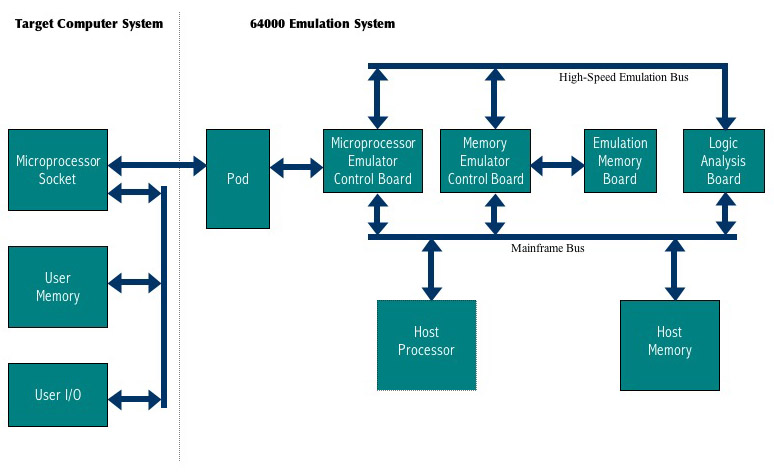
HP 64000 functional block diagram

=== Terminology ===
As shown in the block diagram to the right, a 64000 system consisted of a number of components:

- Mainframe is the physical workstation or card cage holding the option cards.
- Host is the processor that operates the mainframe. In the 64100A and 64110A, the host bus is the workstation processor's address, data, input/output and control buses, which also connect to the cards in the card cage.
- User system is the microprocessor system being developed. The terms user processor and user memory describe those components in the system being developed.
- Emulation or emulator refers to optional cards and other hardware that are connected to the mainframe via the plug-in cards and can replace the processor and/or memory in the user system. Emulation and analysis cards are interconnected with an emulation bus that is completely separated from the host bus.

=== Software development ===
The 64000 provided a file system and text editor for writing software. There was a generic assembler / linker (manual Bitsavers), Pascal compiler (manual Bitsavers), and C compiler (manual Bitsavers), which were supplemented with add-on cross-assemblers and cross-compilers for each particular microprocessor. A list of these by product number follows.

Microprocessor	Assembler product #	Assembler manual	Pascal compiler product #	Pascal compiler manual	C compiler product #	C compiler manual
Motorola 6800/1/2/3/8	64841A	Bitsavers	64811A	Bitsavers	64821A	
Motorola 6809	64844A	Bitsavers	64813A (disk image at HPCM)	Bitsavers	64822A (disk image at HPCM)	Bitsavers
Motorola 68000/08/10	64845A (disk image at HPCM*)	Bitsavers	64815A (disk image at HPCM)	Bitsavers	64819A	Bitsavers
Intel 8048	64846A (disk image at HPCM)	Bitsavers	none		none	
Intel 8051	64855A (disk image at HPCM)		none		none	
Intel 8080/8085	64840A		64810A	Bitsavers	64826A	
Intel 8086/87/88/186/188	64853A (disk image at HPCM)		64814A (disk image at HPCM)		64818A (disk image at HPCM)	
Zilog Z80	64842A (disk image at HPCM)	Bitsavers	64823A (disk image at HPCM)		64824A (disk image at HPCM)	
Zilog Z8	64850A		none		none	
Zilog Z8000	64854A		none		none	
RCA 1802	64848A		none		none	
MOS Technology 6501/6505	64843A		none		none	
Texas Instruments TMS9900	64847A		none		none	
Texas Instruments TMS320	64858A		none		none	
Fairchild F8	64849A		none		none	
MIL-STD-1750A	64857A		none		none	

* HPCM is the Hewlett Packard Computer Museum.

In addition, there was a Pascal "Host Compiler", product number 64817A manual at Bitsavers, disk image at HPCM, which could be used to write programs to execute on the workstation host processor.

=== In-circuit emulation ===
The 64000 system, through the use of optional cards and software, could perform in-circuit emulation of a variety of microprocessors and their memory. A complete emulation system typically consisted of:

- A microprocessor emulator controller card, specific to each microprocessor.
- An emulation "pod" or "probe", which contained interface electronics and was an external module to the mainframe. The processor in the user system was removed from its socket, and a cable from the emulation pod was connected in its place. The emulation pod contained a copy of the user processor that ran program code just as the user processor would, and it appeared to the user system as the normal processor.
- An emulation memory controller card and one or more emulation memory cards. The emulation memory could be used to substitute for memory in the user system so that, for instance, user program code could be placed in the emulation memory and executed rather than needing to program ROM chips.

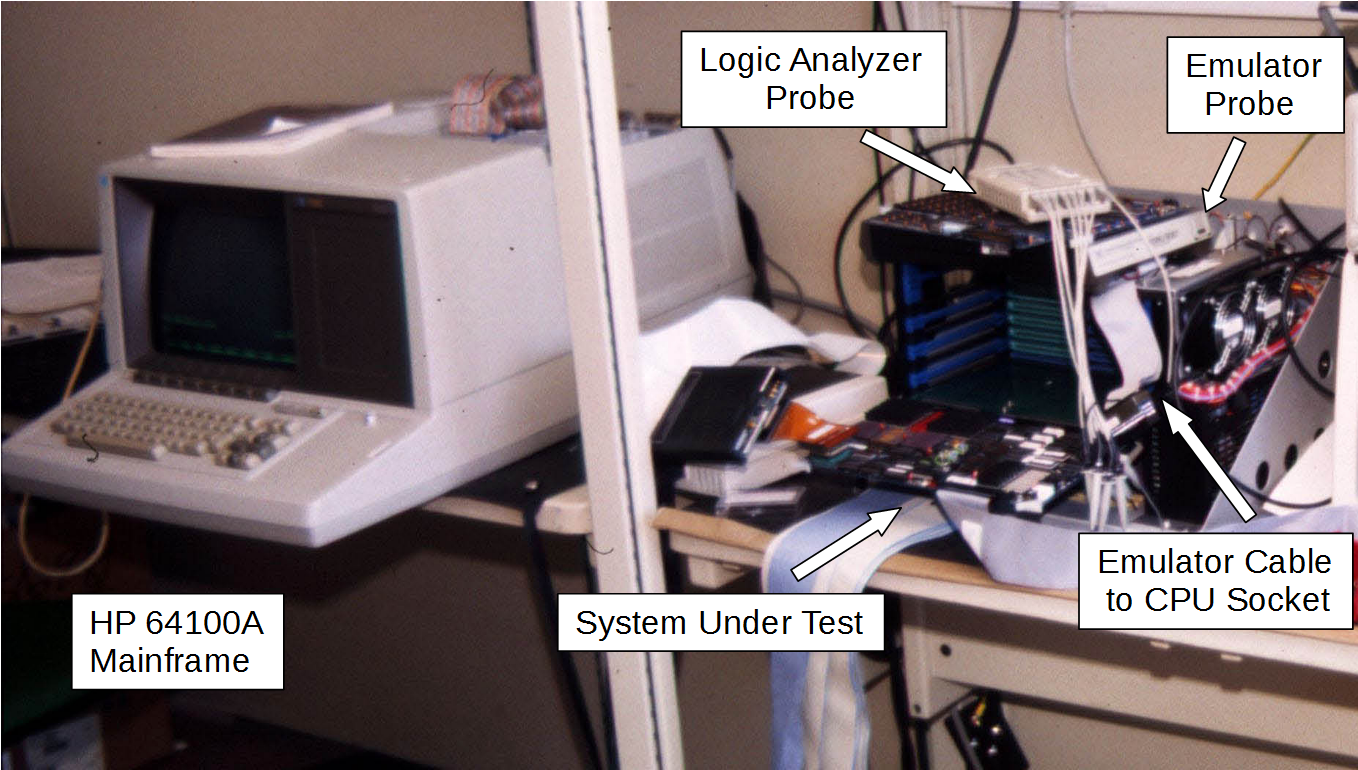
HP64100A Logic Development System emulating a microprocessor

- An "internal" analyzer card, which was a logic analyzer that monitored the operation of the emulated processor and memory.
- Emulator software that allowed the operator to start and stop the emulated processor, examine the contents of memory and register locations, measure signal timing, observe program flow, and so on.

The photo at right shows a 64100A workstation emulating the processor of a user system via an emulator pod. The photo also shows a data acquisition pod for an "external" logic analyzer card in the 64100A that was measuring additional digital signals in the user system.

Microprocessor	Emulator controller card product #	Manual	Emulation pod product #	Manual	Emulation software product #	Manual
Motorola 6800	64211A	Bitsavers	64212A	Bitsavers	64210A	Bitsavers
Motorola 6801/6803	64256A		64255A		64256A	
Motorola 6802/6808	64211A	Bitsavers	64213A	Bitsavers	64210A	Bitsavers
Motorola 6805	64191A	Bitsavers	64192A/64193A	Bitsavers	64192A (disk image at Bitsavers)	
Motorola 6809	64214A	Bitsavers	64215A/64216A	Bitsavers	64215A (disk image at Bitsavers)	Bitsavers
Motorola 68000/68008	64243A/64244A		64243A/64244A		64243A (disk image at HPCM)	Bitsavers
Motorola 68010	64271A		64249A		64249A	
Intel 8048	64261A		64262A		64262A (disk image at HPCM)	
Intel 8051	64263A		64264A		64264A	
Intel 8080	64201A		64202A		64202A	
Intel 8085	64201A		64203A		64203A	
Intel 8086	64271A		64222A		64222A (disk image at HPCM)	
Intel 8088	64271A		64226A		64226A	
Intel 80186	64223A		64224A	Bitsavers	64224A	
Intel 80188	64223A		64225A		64225A	
Zilog Z80	64251A		64252A		64252A (disk image at HPCM)	
Zilog Z8001/8002	64271A		64232A/64233A		64232A/64233A	

* HPCM is the Hewlett Packard Computer Museum.

Emulator control boards connected to both the host (mainframe) bus and the emulation bus. They acted to pass control signals and data between the host and emulated systems. Depending on the model, the control board might also contain hardware to flag illegal opcodes or memory accesses or to act as an internal logic analyzer.

Memory emulation allows RAM and/or ROM in the user system to be replaced by memory in the 64000 system. Two emulation memory controller boards were offered:

- 64151A Emulation Memory Controller (manual at Bitsavers), which had 16 address lines so could address 64 KB of memory, and
- 64155A Wide Address Memory Controller (manual at Bitsavers), which had 24 address lines so could address 16 MB of memory.

Memory maps for the user system could be specified in terms of RAM, ROM and protected memory. Attempted writes to ROM or accessing of protected memory was detected by the memory controller and could trigger actions such as program breakpoints.

Memory cards of various capacities of static RAM were offered. The 64152B, 53B and 54B cards provided 32, 16 and 8 KB, respectively, and the 64161A, 62A and 63A cards provided 128, 64 and 32 KB, respectively. They could each be configured for 8-bit or 16-bit data buses. Memory cards were connected together and to the memory controller through an emulation memory bus. Accesses to emulation memory by either the host or user systems was through the controller card.

Once the emulated processor and memory took the place of the processor and memory in the user system, the designer could write and compile program code, load it into emulation memory and start the user system, running the program in the emulated processor.

=== Analysis ===
A 64000 system could act as a logic analyzer to measure digital signals within the user system. Two types of logic analysis cards were offered, "internal" analyzers which measured signals directly off the emulation bus within the mainframe, and "external" analyzers which used separate probes to physically connect to elements of the user system. Similar to the processor and memory emulation products, analysis functions were often divided into controller cards and data acquisition cards. Some of the emulation processor controller cards offered internal analysis functions without separate hardware.

Logic analysis hardware was also divided into state analyzers and timing analyzers. The former measured signals in synchronization with a system clock and could, for example, record the states of the address, data and control buses in the user system at each CPU cycle. This data was normally presented as a trace, showing the value on each bus for each CPU cycle. For many microprocessors, an "inverse assembler" was available that would convert values measured on the data bus to Opcodes for the user processor.

The second form of logic analysis was timing analysis. A timing, or asynchronous logic, analyzer measured digital signals at specified time intervals, not necessarily synchronized to the user system clock. Such analysis could be used to find glitches or verify digital signals had proper timings.

In addition to these logic analyzer functions, "software analysis" options were available. These tools acted as what are now commonly called debuggers and profilers.

A list of analysis products is:

Product number	Description	Manual
64300A	Internal logic analyzer	
64302A	Internal wide logic analyzer	Bitsavers
64310A	Software performance analyzer	Bitsavers
64331A	68000 high level software analyzer	
64601A	Timing/hardware analyzer controller	Bitsavers
64602A	8 channel timing acquisition	Bitsavers
64604A	8 channel timing probe	Bitsavers
64621A	State/software analyzer controller	Bitsavers
64622A	40 channel state acquisition	Bitsavers
64623A	20 channel state acquisition	Bitsavers
64635A	20 channel state data probe	
64636A	8 channel state clock probe	

Similar to the way the emulation hardware used "pods" with interface hardware tailored to each microprocessor, the analysis hardware used preprocessors to act as an interface to the microprocessor. Aside from the 64304A Emulation Bus Preprocessor (manual at Bitsavers), each of the CPU specific preprocessor interfaces was a circuit board that fit within the 64650A General Purpose Preprocessor module (manual at Bitsavers). That, in turn, connected to the logic analyzer card cables.

Product number	Description
64304A	Emulation bus preprocessor
64653A	8086/8088 preprocessor interface
64655A	8085 preprocessor interface
64657A	80286 preprocessor interface
64658A	80186/80188 preprocessor interface
64670A	68000 preprocessor interface
64671A	6809 preprocessor interface
64672A	6800/6802 preprocessor interface
64673A	68008 preprocessor interface
64674A	68000/68010 preprocessor interface
64680A	Z8001 preprocessor interface
64681A	Z8002 preprocessor interface
64683A	Z80 preprocessor interface
64690A	NSC800 preprocessor interface

=== PROM programmer ===
The 64100A has a space to the right of the keyboard that can accept a PROM programmer module. A common PROM programmer control card, the 64500A (manual at Bitsavers), was installed in the card cage. At least 11 programmer modules, numbered from 64502A to 64520A were available for a variety of PROM and programmable microcontroller chips from different manufacturers.

== MAME emulator ==
An emulation of the 64100A workstation is part of the MAME (Multiple Arcade Machine Emulator) system, under Manufacturer HP and titled "HP 64000". The emulator is open source and the source code is available.
