= X86 calling conventions =

Calling conventions used in x86 architecture programming

This article describes the calling conventions used when programming x86 architecture microprocessors.

Calling conventions describe the interface of called code:

- The order in which atomic (scalar) parameters, or individual parts of a complex parameter, are allocated
- How parameters are passed (pushed on the stack, placed in registers, or a mix of both)
- Which registers the called function must preserve for the caller (also known as: callee-saved registers or non-volatile registers)
- How the task of preparing the stack for, and restoring after, a function call is divided between the caller and the callee

This is intimately related with the assignment of sizes and formats to programming-language types. Another closely related topic is name mangling, which determines how symbol names in the code are mapped to symbol names used by the linker. Calling conventions, type representations, and name mangling are all part of what is known as an application binary interface (ABI).

There are subtle differences in how various compilers implement these conventions, so it is often difficult to interface code which is compiled by different compilers. On the other hand, conventions which are used as an API standard (such as stdcall) are very uniformly implemented.

== Historical background ==
The standard for IBM PC compatibles was defined by the Intel processors (8086, 80386) and the literal hardware IBM shipped. Hardware extensions and all software standards (save for a BIOS calling convention) were thrown open to market competition.

A multitude of independent software firms offered operating systems, compilers for many programming languages, and applications. Many different calling schemes were implemented by the firms, often mutually exclusive, based on different requirements, historical practices, and programmer creativity.

After the IBM compatible market shakeout, Microsoft operating systems and programming tools (with differing conventions) predominated, while second-tier firms like Borland and Novell, and open-source projects like GNU Compiler Collection (GCC), still maintained their own standards. Provisions for interoperability between vendors and products were eventually adopted, simplifying the problem of choosing a viable convention.

== Caller clean-up ==
In these types of calling conventions, the caller cleans the arguments from the stack (resets the state of the stack just as it was before the callee function was called).

=== cdecl ===
The cdecl (which stands for C declaration) is a calling convention for the programming language C and is used by many C compilers for the x86 architecture. In cdecl, subroutine arguments are passed on the stack. If the return values are Integer values or memory addresses they are put into the EAX register by the callee, whereas floating point values are put in the ST0 x87 register. Registers EAX, ECX, and EDX are caller-saved, and the rest are callee-saved. The x87 floating point registers ST0 to ST7 must be empty (popped or freed) when calling a new function, and ST1 to ST7 must be empty on exiting a function. ST0 must also be empty when not used for returning a value.

In the context of the language C, function arguments are pushed on the stack in the right-to-left (RTL) order, i.e. the last argument is pushed first.

Consider the following C source code snippet:

int callee(int, int, int);

int caller(void)
{
	return callee(1, 2, 3) + 5;
}

On x86, it might produce the following assembly code (Intel syntax):

caller:
    ; make new call frame
    ; (some compilers may produce an 'enter' instruction instead)
    push    ebp       ; save old call frame
    mov     ebp, esp  ; initialize new call frame
    ; push call arguments, in reverse
    ; (some compilers may subtract the required space from the stack pointer,
    ; then write each argument directly, see below.
    ; The 'enter' instruction can also do something similar)
    ; sub esp, 12      : 'enter' instruction could do this for us
    ; mov [ebp-4], 3   : or mov [esp+8], 3
    ; mov [ebp-8], 2   : or mov [esp+4], 2
    ; mov [ebp-12], 1  : or mov [esp], 1
    push    3
    push    2
    push    1
    call    callee    ; call subroutine 'callee'
    add     esp, 12   ; remove call arguments from frame
    add     eax, 5    ; modify subroutine result
                      ; (eax is the return value of our callee,
                      ; so we don't have to move it into a local variable)
    ; restore old call frame
    ; (some compilers may produce a 'leave' instruction instead)
                      ; most calling conventions dictate ebp be callee-saved,
                      ; i.e. it's preserved after calling the callee.
                      ; it therefore still points to the start of our stack frame.
                      ; we do need to make sure
                      ; callee doesn't modify (or restore) ebp, though,
                      ; so we need to make sure
                      ; it uses a calling convention which does this
    pop     ebp       ; restore old call frame
    ret               ; return

The caller cleans the stack after the function call returns.

The cdecl calling convention is usually the default calling convention for x86 C compilers, although many compilers provide options to automatically change the calling conventions used. To manually define a function to be cdecl, some support the following syntax:

return_type __cdecl func_name();

==== Variations ====
There are some variations in the interpretation of cdecl. As a result, x86 programs compiled for different operating system platforms and/or by different compilers can be incompatible, even if they both use the "cdecl" convention and do not call out to the underlying environment.

Some compilers return simple data structures with a length of 2 registers or less in the register pair EAX:EDX and larger structures and class objects requiring special treatment by the exception handler (e.g., a defined constructor, destructor, or assignment) are returned in memory. To pass "in memory", the caller allocates memory and passes a pointer to it as a hidden first parameter; the callee populates the memory and returns the pointer, popping the hidden pointer when returning.

On Unix-like systems, the standard calling convention is defined in the System V ABI. There are separate documents for i386, x86-64, K1OM, etc.

In Linux, GCC sets the de facto standard for calling conventions. Since GCC version 4.5, the stack must be aligned to a 16-byte boundary when calling a function (prior versions only required a 4-byte alignment, as per System V ABI) due to the use of SSE aligned-load instructions.

=== syscall ===
This is similar to cdecl in that arguments are pushed right-to-left. However, EAX, ECX, and EDX are not preserved, and the size of the parameter list in doublewords is passed in AL.

Syscall is the standard calling convention for 32 bit OS/2 API.

=== optlink ===
Arguments are pushed right-to-left. The three first (leftmost) arguments are passed in EAX, EDX, and ECX and up to four floating-point arguments are passed in ST0 through ST3, although space for them is reserved in the argument list on the stack. Results are returned in EAX or ST0. Registers EBP, EBX, ESI, and EDI are preserved.

Optlink is used by the IBM VisualAge compilers.

== Callee clean-up ==
In these conventions, the callee cleans up the arguments from the stack. Functions which use these conventions are easy to recognize in ASM code because they will unwind the stack after returning. The x86 ret instruction allows an optional 16-bit parameter that specifies the number of stack bytes to release after returning to the caller. Such code looks like this:

ret 12

Conventions named fastcall or register have not been standardized, and have been implemented differently, depending on the compiler vendor. Typically register based calling conventions pass one or more arguments in registers which reduces the number of memory accesses required for the call and, thus, usually make them faster.

=== Pascal ===
Based on the Borland Turbo Pascal language's calling convention, the parameters are pushed on the stack in left-to-right (LTR) order (opposite of cdecl), and the callee is responsible for removing them from the stack.

Returning the result works as follows:

- Ordinal values are returned in AL (8-bit values), AX (16-bit values), EAX (32-bit values), or DX:AX (32-bit values on 16-bit systems).
- Real values are returned in DX:BX:AX.
- Floating point (8087) values are returned in ST0.
- Pointers are returned in EAX on 32-bit systems and in AX in 16-bit systems.
- Strings are returned in a temporary location pointed by the @Result symbol.

This calling convention was common in the following 16-bit APIs: OS/2 1.x, Microsoft Windows 3.x, and Borland Delphi version 1.x. Modern versions of the Windows API use stdcall, which still has the callee restoring the stack as in the Pascal convention, but the parameters are now pushed right to left.

=== stdcall ===
The stdcall calling convention is a variation on the Pascal calling convention in which the callee is responsible for cleaning up the stack, but the parameters are pushed onto the stack in right-to-left order, as in the _cdecl calling convention. Registers EAX, ECX, and EDX are designated for use within the function. Return values are stored in the EAX register.

stdcall is the standard calling convention for the Microsoft Win32 API and for Open Watcom C++.

=== Microsoft fastcall ===
The Microsoft __fastcall convention passes the first two arguments that fit (evaluated left to right) into ECX and EDX. Remaining arguments are pushed onto the stack from right to left. When the compiler compiles for IA64 or AMD64, it ignores the __fastcall keyword (or any other calling convention keyword aside from __vectorcall) and uses the Microsoft default 64-bit calling convention instead.

Other compilers like GCC and Clang provide similar "fastcall" calling conventions, although they are not necessarily compatible with each other or with Microsoft fastcall.

Consider the following C snippet:

__attribute__((fastcall)) void printnums(int num1, int num2, int num3){
	printf("The numbers you sent are: %d %d %d", num1, num2, num3);
}

int main(){
	printnums(1, 2, 3);
	return 0;
}

x86 decompilation of the main function will look like (in Intel syntax):

main:
	; stack setup
	push ebp
	mov ebp, esp
	push 3 ; immediate 3 (third argument is pushed to the stack)
	mov edx, 0x2 ; immediate 2 (second argument) is copied to edx register.
	mov ecx, 0x1 ; immediate 1 (first argument) is copied to ecx register.
	call printnums
	mov eax, 0 ; return 0
	leave
	retn

The first two arguments are passed in the left to right order, and the third argument is pushed on the stack. There is no stack cleanup, as stack cleanup is performed by the callee. The disassembly of the callee function is:

printnums:
	; stack setup
	push ebp
	mov ebp, esp
	sub esp, 0x08
	mov [ebp-0x04], ecx    ; in x86, ecx = first argument.
	mov [ebp-0x08], edx    ; arg2
	push [ebp+0x08]        ; arg3 is pushed to stack.
	push [ebp-0x08]        ; arg2 is pushed
	push [ebp-0x04]        ; arg1 is pushed
	push 0x8065d67         ; "The numbers you sent are %d %d %d"
	call printf
	; stack cleanup
	add esp, 0x10
	nop
	leave
	retn 0x04

As the two arguments were passed through the registers and only one parameter was pushed in the stack, the pushed value is being cleared by the retn instruction, as int is 4 bytes in size in x86 systems.

=== Microsoft vectorcall ===
In Visual Studio 2013, Microsoft introduced the __vectorcall calling convention in response to efficiency concerns from game, graphic, video/audio, and codec developers. The scheme allows for larger vector types (float, double, __m128, __m256) to be passed in registers as opposed to on the stack.

__vectorcall adds support for passing homogeneous vector aggregate (HVA) values, which are composite types (structs) consisting solely of up to four identical vector types, using the same six registers. Once the registers have been allocated for vector type arguments, the unused registers are allocated to HVA arguments from left to right. The positioning rules still apply. Resulting vector type and HVA values are returned using the first four XMM/YMM registers.

For IA-32 and x64 code, __vectorcall is similar to __fastcall and the original x64 calling conventions respectively, but extends them to support passing vector arguments using SIMD registers. In IA-32, the integer values are passed as usual, and the first six SIMD (XMM/YMM0-5) registers hold up to six floating-point, vector, or HVA values sequentially from left to right, regardless of actual positions caused by, e.g. an int argument appearing between them. In x64, however, the rule from the original x64 convention still apply, so that XMM/YMM0-5 only hold floating-point, vector, or HVA arguments when they happen to be the first through the sixth.

The Clang compiler and the Intel C++ Compiler also implement vectorcall.

vectorcall only handles the 256-bit (AVX, YMM) view of the vector registers. It does not cover the AVX-512 (ZMM) view.

=== Intel register ===
Before __vectorcall, ICC has a similar convention called __regcall, where as many parameters are stuffed into the registers as possible. It is also supported by clang.

Intel has a Vector Function ABI based on __regcall not implemented by clang (as of November 2025). It deals with vectors of ordinary types, so most parameters are passed (and the results returned) via [XYZ]MM registers. A variant of this ABI employing instead the x86_64 platform's usual System V calling convention with regard to register use is adopted by glibc's libmvec and supported by GCC, Clang, and ICC.

=== GNU and clang modifiers ===
On 32-bit x86, GNU has a regparm attribute that causes up to three non-variadic parameters to be passed in EAX, EDX, and ECX. It is less of its own calling convention and more of a modification that can be applied to existing calling conventions.

Clang has similar "convention modifiers" in the form of preserve_all, preserve_none, preserve_most, broadly applicable to many architectures. GCC supports preserve_none on x86 and x86-64.

=== Borland register ===
Evaluating arguments from left to right, it passes three arguments via EAX, EDX, ECX. Remaining arguments are pushed onto the stack, also left to right. It is the default calling convention of the 32-bit compiler of Delphi, where it is known as register. This calling convention is also used by Embarcadero's C++Builder, where it is called __fastcall. In this compiler, Microsoft's fastcall can be used as __msfastcall.

GCC and Clang can be made to use a similar calling convention by using __stdcall with the regparm function attribute or the -mregparm=3 switch. (The stack order is inverted.) It is also possible to produce a caller clean-up variant using cdecl or extend this to also use SSE registers. A cdecl-based version is used by the Linux kernel on i386 since version 2.6.20 (released February 2007).

=== Watcom register ===
Watcom does not support the __fastcall keyword except to alias it to null. The register calling convention may be selected by command line switch.

Up to 4 registers are assigned to arguments in the order EAX, EDX, EBX, ECX. Arguments are assigned to registers from left to right. If any argument cannot be assigned to a register (say it is too large) it, and all subsequent arguments, are assigned to the stack. Arguments assigned to the stack are pushed from right to left. Names are mangled by adding a suffixed underscore. The stack is cleaned up by the calling function.

Variadic functions fall back to the Watcom stack based calling convention.

The Watcom C/C++ compiler also uses the #pragma aux directive that allows the user to specify their own calling convention. As its manual states, "Very few users are likely to need this method, but if it is needed, it can be a lifesaver".

=== TopSpeed, Clarion, JPI ===
The first four integer parameters are passed in registers EAX, EBX, ECX and EDX. Floating point parameters are passed on the floating point stack – registers ST0, ST1, ST2, ST3, ST4, ST5 and ST6. Structure parameters are always passed on the stack. Added parameters are passed on the stack after registers are exhausted. Integer values are returned in EAX, pointers in EDX and floating point types in ST0.

=== safecall ===
In Delphi and Free Pascal on Microsoft Windows, the safecall calling convention encapsulates COM (Component Object Model) error handling, thus exceptions aren't leaked out to the caller, but are reported in the HRESULT return value, as required by COM/OLE. When calling a safecall function from Delphi code, Delphi also automatically checks the returned HRESULT and raises an exception if needed.

The safecall calling convention is the same as the stdcall calling convention, except that exceptions are passed back to the caller in EAX as a HResult (instead of in FS:[0]), while the function result is passed by reference on the stack as though it were a final "out" parameter. When calling a Delphi function from Delphi this calling convention will appear just like any other calling convention, because although exceptions are passed back in EAX, they are automatically converted back to proper exceptions by the caller. When using COM objects created in other languages, the HResults will be automatically raised as exceptions, and the result for Get functions is in the result rather than a parameter. When creating COM objects in Delphi with safecall, there is no need to worry about HResults, as exceptions can be raised as normal but will be seen as HResults in other languages.

function function_name(a: DWORD): DWORD; safecall;

Returns a result and raises exceptions like a normal Delphi function, but it passes values and exceptions as though it was:

function function_name(a: DWORD; out Result: DWORD): HResult; stdcall;

== Either caller or callee clean-up ==
=== thiscall ===
This calling convention is used for calling C++ non-static member functions. There are two primary versions of thiscall used depending on the compiler and whether or not the function uses a variable number of arguments.

For the GCC compiler, thiscall is almost identical to cdecl: The caller cleans the stack, and the parameters are passed in right-to-left order. The difference is the addition of the this pointer, which is pushed onto the stack last, as if it were the first parameter in the function prototype.

On the Microsoft Visual C++ compiler, the this pointer is passed in ECX and it is the callee that cleans the stack, mirroring the stdcall convention used in C for this compiler and in Windows API functions. When functions use a variable number of arguments, it is the caller that cleans the stack (cf. cdecl).

The thiscall calling convention can only be explicitly specified on Microsoft Visual C++ 2005 and later. On any other compiler thiscall is not a keyword. (However, disassemblers, such as IDA, must specify it. So IDA uses keyword __thiscall for this.)

== Register preservation ==
Another part of a calling convention is which registers are guaranteed to retain their values after a subroutine call. This behavior is known as register preservation.

=== Caller-saved (volatile) registers ===
According to the Intel ABI to which the vast majority of compilers conform, EAX, EDX, and ECX are to be free for use within a procedure or function, and need not be preserved.

As the name implies, these general-purpose registers usually hold temporary (volatile) information, that can be overwritten by any subroutine.

Therefore, it is the caller's responsibility to push each of these registers onto the stack, if it would like to restore their values after a subroutine call.

=== Callee-saved (non-volatile) registers ===
The other registers are used to hold long-lived values (non-volatile), that should be preserved across calls.

In other words, when the caller makes a procedure call, it can expect that those registers will hold the same value after the callee returns.

Thus, making it the callee's responsibility to both save (push at the start) and restore (pop accordingly) them before returning to the caller. As in the prior case, this practice should only be done on registers that the callee changes.

== x86-64 calling conventions ==
x86-64 calling conventions take advantage of the added register space to pass more arguments in registers. Also, the number of incompatible calling conventions has been reduced. There are two in common use.

=== Microsoft x64 calling convention ===
The Microsoft x64 calling convention is followed on Windows and pre-boot UEFI (for long mode on x86-64). The first four arguments are placed onto the registers. That means RCX, RDX, R8, and R9 (in that order) for integer, struct or pointer arguments, and XMM0, XMM1, XMM2, and XMM3 for floating-point arguments. Added arguments are pushed onto the stack (right to left). Integer return values (similar to x86) are returned in RAX if 64 bits or less. Floating-point return values are returned in XMM0. Parameters less than 64 bits long are not zero-extended; the high bits are not zeroed.

Structs and unions with sizes that match integers are passed and returned as if they were integers. Otherwise, they are replaced with a pointer when used as an argument. When a return of an oversized struct is needed, another pointer to a caller-provided space is prepended as the first argument, shifting all other arguments to the right by one place. This pointer also becomes the return value in RAX.

When compiling for the x64 architecture in a Windows context (whether using Microsoft or non-Microsoft tools), stdcall, thiscall, cdecl, and fastcall all resolve to using this convention.

In the Microsoft x64 calling convention, it is the caller's responsibility to allocate 32 bytes of "shadow space" on the stack right before calling the function (regardless of the actual number of parameters used), and to pop the stack after the call. The shadow space is used to spill RCX, RDX, R8, and R9, but must be made available to all functions, even those with fewer than four parameters.

The registers RAX, RCX, RDX, R8, R9, R10, and R11 are considered volatile (caller-saved).

The registers RBX, RBP, RDI, RSI, RSP, R12, R13, R14, and R15 are considered nonvolatile (callee-saved).

For example, a function taking 5 integer arguments will take the first to fourth in registers, and the fifth will be pushed on top of the shadow space. So when the called function is entered, the stack will be composed of (in ascending order) the return address, followed by the shadow space (32 bytes) followed by the fifth parameter.

The stack frame is aligned to 16 bytes.

Visual Studio 2008 stores floating-point numbers in XMM6 and XMM7, in addition to XMM8 through XMM15.

The calling convention does not make use of the YMM and ZMM portions of vector registers for argument and result-passing.

=== System V AMD64 ABI ===
The calling convention of the System V AMD64 ABI is followed on Solaris, Linux, FreeBSD, macOS, and is the de facto standard among Unix and Unix-like operating systems. The OpenVMS Calling Standard on x86-64 is based on the System V ABI with some extensions needed for backwards compatibility.

The first six integer or pointer arguments are passed in registers RDI, RSI, RDX, RCX, R8, R9 (R10 is used as a static chain pointer in case of nested functions), while XMM0, XMM1, XMM2, XMM3, XMM4, XMM5, XMM6 and XMM7 are used for the first floating point arguments. As in the Microsoft x64 calling convention, added arguments are passed on the stack. Integer return values up to 64 bits in size are stored in RAX while values up to 128 bit are stored in RAX and RDX. Floating-point return values are similarly stored in XMM0 and XMM1. The wider YMM and ZMM registers are used for passing and returning wider values in place of XMM when they exist.

Struct and union parameters with sizes of two (eight in case of only SSE fields) pointers or fewer that are aligned on 64-bit boundaries are decomposed into "eightbytes" and each one is classified and passed as a separate parameter, as long as there are enough registers available. Otherwise, they are passed in memory. Struct and union return types with sizes of two pointers or fewer are returned in RAX and RDX (or XMM0 and XMM1). When an oversized struct return is needed, another pointer to a caller-provided space is prepended as the first argument, shifting all other arguments to the right by one place, and the value of this pointer is returned in RAX.

If the callee wishes to use registers RBX, RSP, RBP, and R12–R15, it must restore their original values before returning control to the caller. All other registers must be saved by the caller if it wishes to preserve their values.

For leaf-node functions (functions which do not call any other function(s)), a 128-byte space is stored just beneath the stack pointer of the function. The space is called the red zone. This zone will not be overwritten by any signal or interrupt handlers. Compilers can thus use this zone to save local variables. Compilers may omit some instructions at the starting of the function (adjustment of RSP, RBP) by using this zone. However, other functions may overwrite this zone. Therefore, this zone should only be used for leaf-node functions. gcc and clang offer the -mno-red-zone flag to disable red-zone optimizations.

If the callee is a variadic function, then the number of floating point arguments passed to the function in vector registers must be provided by the caller in the AL register.

The stack frame is aligned to a 16-byte boundary by default. If a __m256 (AVX) type is passed on the stack, it needs to instead be 32-byte aligned; if a __m512 (AVX512) type is passed, it needs to instead be 64-byte aligned.

Unlike the Microsoft calling convention, a shadow space is not provided; on function entry, the return address is adjacent to the seventh integer argument on the stack.

=== Special x64 calling conventions ===
- Starting with Visual Studio 2013, Microsoft introduced the __vectorcall calling convention, which extends the x64 convention. For a full description, see § Microsoft vectorcall above.
- Intel register (see above).

== List of x86 calling conventions ==
This is a list of x86 calling conventions. These are conventions primarily intended for C/C++ compilers (especially the 64-bit part below), and thus largely special cases. Other languages may use other formats and conventions in their implementations.

Architecture	Name	Operating system, compiler	Parameters		Stack cleanup	Notes
Architecture	Name	Operating system, compiler	Registers	Stack order	Stack cleanup	Notes
8086	cdecl			RTL (C)	Caller	
8086	Pascal			LTR (Pascal)	Callee	
8086	fastcall (non-member)	Microsoft	AX, DX, BX	LTR (Pascal)	Callee	Return pointer in BX.
8086	fastcall (member function)	Microsoft	AX, DX	LTR (Pascal)	Callee	this on stack low address. Return pointer in AX.
8086	fastcall	Turbo C	AX, DX, BX	LTR (Pascal)	Callee	this on stack low address. Return pointer on stack high address.
8086	watcall	Watcom	AX, DX, BX, CX	RTL (C)	Caller	Return pointer in SI.
IA-32	cdecl	Unix-like (GCC)		RTL (C)	Caller	When returning struct/class, the calling code allocates space and passes a pointer to this space via a hidden parameter on the stack. The called function writes the return value to this address. Stack aligned on 16-byte boundary due to a GCC change.
IA-32	cdecl	Microsoft		RTL (C)	Caller	When returning struct/class, Plain old data (POD) return values 32 bits or smaller are in the EAX register; POD return values 33–64 bits in size are returned via the EAX:EDX registers.; Non-POD return values or values larger than 64-bits, the calling code will allocate space and passes a pointer to this space via a hidden parameter on the stack. The called function writes the return value to this address.; Stack aligned on 4-byte boundary.
IA-32	stdcall	Microsoft		RTL (C)	Callee	Also supported by GCC.
IA-32	fastcall	Microsoft	ECX, EDX	RTL (C)	Callee	Return pointer on stack if not member function. Also supported by GCC.
IA-32	register	Delphi, Free Pascal, Linux	EAX, EDX, ECX	LTR (Pascal)	Callee	
IA-32	thiscall	Windows (Microsoft Visual C++)	ECX	RTL (C)	Callee	Default for member functions.
IA-32	vectorcall	Windows (Microsoft Visual C++)	ECX, EDX, [XY]MM0–5	RTL (C)	Callee	Extended from fastcall. Also supported by ICC and Clang.
IA-32	watcall	Watcom	EAX, EDX, EBX, ECX	RTL (C)	Caller	Return pointer in ESI.
x86-64	Microsoft x64 calling convention	Windows (Microsoft Visual C++, GCC, Intel C++ Compiler, Delphi), UEFI	RCX/XMM0, RDX/XMM1, R8/XMM2, R9/XMM3	RTL (C)	Caller	Stack aligned on 16 bytes. 32 bytes shadow space on stack. The specified 8 registers can only be used for parameters 1 through 4. For C++ class methods, the hidden this parameter is the first parameter, and is passed in RCX.
x86-64	vectorcall	Windows (Microsoft Visual C++, Clang, ICC)	RCX/[XY]MM0, RDX/[XY]MM1, R8/[XY]MM2, R9/[XY]MM3 + [XY]MM4–5	RTL (C)	Caller	Extended from MS x64.
x86-64	System V AMD64 ABI	Solaris, Linux, BSD, macOS, OpenVMS (GCC, Intel C++ Compiler, Clang, Delphi)	RDI, RSI, RDX, RCX, R8, R9, [XYZ]MM0–7	RTL (C)	Caller	Stack aligned on 16 bytes boundary. 128 bytes red zone below stack. The kernel interface uses RDI, RSI, RDX, R10, R8 and R9. For C++ class methods, the hidden this parameter is the first parameter passed in RDI.
x86-64	regcall	Windows, Linux (Clang, ICC)	RAX, RCX, RDX, RDI, RSI, R8, R9, R10, R11, R12, R14, R15 + [XYZ]MM0-15 + R10 on Linux	RTL (C)	Caller	Uses as many registers for passing parameters and returning values as possible.

Note:

- GCC, clang, and to a lesser extent ICC are able to use any calling convention on any platform if asked to do so using attributes such as ms_abi, sysv_abi, and fastcall. This is useful in building software that cross ABI boundaries such as wine.
