= Leaf routine =

Subroutines in computer science

A leaf routine, leaf subroutine, leaf function, or leaf procedure is a function that does not in turn call another function. Some compilers can apply special program optimizations to leaf routines to make them more efficient, such as the use of link registers to avoid having to push the return address on the stack, or not allocating a register window on CPU architectures descended from Berkeley RISC.

The term "leaf" refers to their position as leaf nodes in the call graph of the program.

Usually, most non-leaf routines call more than one other function. When this is the case, the majority of function calls in the call graph are calls to leaf routines, because a binary tree has more leaf nodes than non-leaf nodes (assuming that all non-leaf nodes have two children). Consequently, the efficiency of calls to leaf routines often has a significant effect on the efficiency of the whole program.
