= Function prologue and epilogue =

Concept in assembly language programming

In assembly language programming, the function prologue is a few lines of code at the beginning of a function, which prepare the stack and registers for use within the function. Similarly, the function epilogue appears at the end of the function, and restores the stack and registers to the state they were in before the function was called.

The prologue and epilogue are not a part of the assembly language itself; they represent a convention used by assembly language programmers, and compilers of many higher-level languages. They are fairly rigid, having the same form in each function.

Function prologue and epilogue also sometimes contain code for buffer overflow protection.

== Prologue ==
A function prologue typically does the following actions if the architecture has a base pointer (also known as frame pointer) and a stack pointer:

- Pushes current base pointer onto the stack, so it can be restored later.
- Value of base pointer is set to the address of stack pointer (which is pointed to the top of the stack) so that the base pointer will point to the top of the stack.
- Moves the stack pointer further by decreasing or increasing its value, depending on whether the stack grows down or up. On x86, the stack pointer is decreased to make room for the function's local variables.

Several possible prologues can be written, resulting in slightly different stack configuration. These differences are acceptable, as long as the programmer or compiler uses the stack in the correct way inside the function.

As an example, here is a typical x86 assembly language function prologue as produced by the GCC

	push ebp
	mov	ebp, esp
	sub	esp, N

The N immediate value is the number of bytes reserved on the stack for local use.

The same result may be achieved by using the enter instruction:

	enter	N, 0

More complex prologues can be obtained using different values (other than 0) for the second operand of the enter instruction. These prologues push several base/frame pointers to allow for nested functions, as required by languages such as Pascal. However, modern versions of these languages don′t use these instructions because they limit the nesting depth in some cases.

== Epilogue ==
Function epilogue reverses the actions of the function prologue and returns control to the calling function. It typically does the following actions (this procedure may differ from one architecture to another):

- Drop the stack pointer to the current base pointer, so room reserved in the prologue for local variables is freed.
- Pops the base pointer off the stack, so it is restored to its value before the prologue.
- Returns to the calling function, by popping the previous frame's program counter off the stack and jumping to it.

The given epilogue will reverse the effects of either of the above prologues (either the full one, or the one which uses enter). Under certain calling conventions it is the callee's responsibility to clean the arguments off the stack, so the epilogue can also include the step of moving the stack pointer down or up.

For example, these three steps may be accomplished in 32-bit x86 assembly language by the following instructions:

	mov	esp, ebp
	pop	ebp
	ret

Like the prologue, the x86 processor contains a built-in instruction which performs part of the epilogue. The following code is equivalent to the above code:

	leave
	ret

The leave instruction performs the mov and pop instructions, as outlined above.

A function may contain multiple epilogues. Every function exit point must either jump to a common epilogue at the end, or contain its own epilogue. Therefore, programmers or compilers often use the combination of leave and ret to exit the function at any point. (For example, a C compiler would substitute a return statement with a leave/ret sequence).
